= List of presidents of the American Statistical Association =

The president of the American Statistical Association is the head of the American Statistical Association (ASA). According to the association's bylaws, the president is an officer, and a member of the board of directors and of the executive committee. Elections for the position are held annually, in which all full members are eligible to vote. The term in office is typically three years, as president-elect and past president are also official positions.

== List of presidents ==
=== 19th century ===
No.	Image	Name	Term
1		Richard Fletcher	1839 – 1845
2		George Cheyne Shattuck Sr.	1846 – 1851
3		Edward Jarvis	1852 – 1882
4		Francis Amasa Walker	1883 – 1896
5		Carroll D. Wright	1897 – 1909

=== 20th century ===
No.	Image	Name	Term
6		S. N. D. North	1910
7		Frederick Ludwig Hoffman	1911
8		Walter Francis Willcox	1912
9		John Koren	1914
10		E. Dana Durand	1915
11		Charles P. Neill	1916
12		Allyn Abbott Young	1917
13		Wesley Clair Mitchell	1918
14		Joseph Adna Hill	1919
15		George E. Roberts	1920
16		Carroll W. Doten	1921
17		William S. Rossiter	1922
18		Warren M. Persons	1923
19		Louis Israel Dublin	1924
20		Robert E. Chaddock	1925
21		Leonard Porter Ayres	1926
22		Edmund E. Day	1927
23		Carl Snyder	1928
24		Edwin B. Wilson	1929
25		Malcolm C. Rorty	1930
26		William Fielding Ogburn	1931
27		Irving Fisher	1932
28		Stuart A. Rice	1933
29		Frederick C. Mills	1934
30		Willford I. King	1935
31		Joseph S. Davis	1936
32		Warren Randolph Burgess	1937
33		Robert H. Coats	1938
34		Raymond Pearl	1939
35		F. Leslie Hayford	1940
36		Winfield W. Riefler	1941
37		Alfred J. Lotka	1942
38		Emanuel A. Goldenweiser	1943
39		Helen M. Walker	1944
40		Walter A. Shewhart	1945
41		Isador Lubin	1946
42		Willard Thorp	1947
43		George W. Snedecor	1948
44		Simon Kuznets	1949
45		Samuel S. Wilks	1950
46		Lowell J. Reed	1951
47		Aryness Joy Wickens	1952
48		William Gemmell Cochran	1953
49		Herbert Marshall	1954
50		Ralph J. Watkins	1955
51		Gertrude Mary Cox	1956
52		William R. Leonard	1957
53		Walter E. Hoadley	1958
54		Rensis Likert	1959
55		Morris H. Hansen	1960
56		Martin R. Gainsbrugh	1961
57		Philip M. Hauser	1962
58		Raymond T. Bowman	1963
59		Albert H. Bowker	1964
60		W. Allen Wallis	1965
61		Frederick F. Stephan	1966
62		Frederick Mosteller	1967
63		Geoffrey H. Moore	1968
64		A. Ross Eckler	1969
65		T. A. Bancroft	1970
66		Churchill Eisenhart	1971
67		William H. Shaw	1972
68		Clifford G. Hildreth	1973
69		Jerome Cornfield	1974
70		Lester Frankel	1975
71		Franklin A. Graybill	1976
72		Leslie Kish	1977
73		George E. P. Box	1978
74		Herman Otto Hartley	1979
75		Margaret E. Martin	1980
76		Ralph A. Bradley	1981
77		William Kruskal	1982
78		Richard L. Anderson	1983
79		I. Richard Savage	1984
80		John Neter	1985
81		Donald Marquardt	1986
82		Barbara A. Bailar	1987
83		Robert V. Hogg	1988
84		Janet L. Norwood	1989
85		Vincent P. Barabba	1990
86		Arnold Zellner	1991
87		Katherine K. Wallman	1992
88		John Stuart Hunter	1993
89		Ronald L. Iman	1994
90		Mitchell H. Gail	1995
91		Lynne Billard	1996
92		Jon R. Kettenring	1997
93		David S. Moore	1998
94		Jonas H. Ellenberg	1999

=== 21st century ===
No.	Image	Name	Term
95		W. Michael O'Fallon	2000
96		Richard L. Scheaffer	2001
97		Miron L. Straf	2002
98		Robert L. Mason	2003
99		Bradley Efron	2004
100		Fritz J. Scheuren	2005
101		Sallie Keller McNulty	2006
102		Mary Ellen Bock	2007
103		Peter A. Lachenbruch	2008
104		Sally C. Morton	2009
105		Sastry G. Pantula	2010
106		Nancy L. Geller	2011
107		Robert N. Rodriguez	2012
108		Marie Davidian	2013
109		Nathaniel Schenker	2014
110		David R. Morganstein	2015
111		Jessica Utts	2016
112		Barry D. Nussbaum	2017
113		Lisa LaVange	2018
114		Karen Kafadar	2019
115		Wendy L. Martinez	2020
116		Robert L. Santos	2021
117		Katherine B. Ensor	2022
118		Dionne L. Price	2023
119		Bonnie Ghosh-Dastidar	2024
120		Ji-Hyun Lee	2025
