= American Statistical Association Founders Award =

- Awarded for: Distinguished service to the association over a long period of time
- Country: United States
- Presented by: American Statistical Association
- First award: 1989
- Website: https://www.amstat.org/your-career/awards/founders-award

The American Statistical Association Founders Award is presented by the American Statistical Association (ASA) to members who have rendered distinguished service to the association over a long period of time—often in a variety of leadership roles. Members who have made substantial contributions to the association's objectives and whose influence has lasted beyond their immediate tenure are eligible for the Founders Award. Along with fellowships, the Founders Award is one of the highest honors presented by the ASA.

== Recipients ==
Recipients of the award are listed below.

=== 1989 ===
- Fred C. Leone – American statistician (1922–2016)
- Margaret E. Martin – American economist and statistician (1912-2012)

=== 1990 ===
- John Neter – American statistician (1923–2022)
- Morris H. Hansen – American statistician (1910–1990)
- Richard L. Scheaffer

=== 1991 ===
- Ingram Olkin – American statistician (1924–2016)
- Joan R. Rosenblatt – American statistician (1926-2018)
- Paul D. Minton
- Robert V. Hogg – American statistician and academic (1924–2014)
- Ronald L. Iman – American mathematician

=== 1992 ===
- Frederick Mosteller – American statistician (1916–2006)
- John D. McKenzie
- Ralph A. Bradley – Canadian-American statistician (1923-2001)
- Richard Loree Anderson – American econometrician (1915-2003)
- Robert L. Mason
- William H. Kruskal – American mathematician and statistician (1919–2005)

=== 1993 ===
- Bruce E. Trumbo
- Daniel G. Horvitz – American survey statistician (1921-2008)
- I. Richard Savage – American statistician (1925–2004)
- Rich D. Allen
- Samuel W. Greenhouse – American statistician (1918–2000)

=== 1994 ===
- David C. Hoaglin
- James M. Landwehr
- Vicki Hertzberg – American biostatistician

=== 1995 ===
- Charles H. Goldsmith
- Donald Marquardt – American mathematician (1929–1997)
- John Stuart Hunter – American statistician and engineer (born 1923)
- Mary Foulkes – American biostatistician (1949–2025)

=== 1996 ===
- Donald Guthrie
- Michael H. Kutner
- Ramanathan Gnanadesikan – Indian statistician (1932-2015)
- Susan Ellenberg – American statistician

=== 1997 ===
- Barbara Bailar – American statistician (1935–2023)
- Judith Tanur – American statistician and sociologist (born 1935)
- Lorraine Denby – American statistician and Civil Air Patrol pilot

=== 1998 ===
- David R. Morganstein
- Fritz Scheuren – American statistician
- Janet L. Norwood – American statistician (1923–2015)
- Jerome Sacks

=== 1999 ===
- Gladys H. Reynolds – American statistician
- Jerry L. Moreno
- Richard F. Gunst

=== 2000 ===
- Nancy J. Kirkendall – American government statistician

=== 2001 ===
- David S. Moore – American statistician
- Jon R. Kettenring

=== 2002 ===
- Edward Wegman – American statistician
- Sallie Keller-McNulty – American statistician
- W. Michael O'Fallon

=== 2003 ===
- James H. Matis
- Lynne Billard – Australian statistician and academic
- Roxy Peck – Statistics educator

=== 2004 ===
- Dallas E. Johnson
- Ray A. Waller
- Roger Hoerl
- William R. Schucany

=== 2005 ===
- Albert Madansky – American statistician (1934–2022)
- Joan Garfield – American educational psychologist
- Linda Gage – American demographer

=== 2006 ===
- E. Jacquelin Dietz – American statistician (1951–2020)
- Joe H. Ward
- John E. Boyer Jr.
- Robert L. Santos – American statistician (born 1957)
- Wendy L. Alvey

=== 2007 ===
- Gary McDonald
- George Cobb
- Katherine Wallman – American statistician (died 2024)

=== 2008 ===
- David Scott
- Linda J. Young – American statistician

=== 2009 ===
- Bob Rodriguez
- Jessica Utts – American statistician
- June Morita – American statistician and statistics educator
- Stephen Fienberg – American statistician (1942–2016)
- W. Robert Stephenson

=== 2010 ===
- Dan Solomon
- George Williams
- Janet Buckingham

=== 2011 ===
- William B. Smith
- Nat Schenker
- Robert Starbuck
- Wayne Fuller – American statistician (born 1931)

=== 2012 ===
- Christy Chuang-Stein – Taiwanese-American statistician
- Lynne Stokes – American statistician
- Mary Batcher – American statistician

=== 2013 ===
- Jeri Mulrow – American statistician
- Mary Ellen Bock – American statistician
- Xiao-Li Meng – Chinese American statistician (born 1963)

=== 2014 ===
- Christine A. Franklin – American statistics educator
- James Cochran
- Sastry Pantula

=== 2015 ===
- David L. Banks – American statistician
- Jim Albert
- Sally C. Morton – American statistician

=== 2016 ===
- Jim Rosenberger
- John Czajka
- Maura Stokes – American statistician and novelist
- Rod Little

=== 2017 ===
- Jane Pendergast – American biostatistician
- John Eltinge
- Nick Horton
- Wendy L. Martinez – American statistician

=== 2018 ===
- Alicia L. Carriquiry – Uruguayan statistician
- Daniel Kasprzyk
- Marie Davidian – American biostatistician

=== 2019 ===
- Allan J. Rossman
- Dalene Stangl – American statistician
- David A. van Dyk
- Nancy Flournoy – American statistician
- William I. Notz

=== 2020 ===
- John Bailer – American statistician
- Ronald S. Fecso

=== 2021 ===
- Katherine Monti – American biostatistician
- Scott Evans
- Xuming He – Statistician

=== 2022 ===
- David Marker
- Hal S. Stern – American statistician
- Jean Opsomer
- Paula Roberson – Biostatistician
- Stephanie Shipp – American economist and social statistician

=== 2023 ===
- Amarjot Kaur – Indian statistician
- Karen Kafadar – American statistician
- Mary J. Kwasny – American biostatistician
- Theresa Utlaut – American statistician
- Vijayan Nair – American statistician

=== 2024 ===
- Barry D. Nussbaum – American statistician
- Dionne Price – African-American statistician (1971-2024)
- Julia Sharp – American statistician
- Kathy Ensor – American statistician
- Richard De Veaux

=== 2025 ===
- Barry Graubard
- Jeff Witmer
- Kate Calder – American statistician and data scientist
- Mark Glickman
- Robert Gould

=== 2026 ===
- Alexandra Hanlon
- Donna LaLonde
- Cynthia Long
