= Christine Franklin =

Christine Franklin may refer to:

- Christine A. Franklin, American statistics educator
- Christine Ladd-Franklin (1847–1930), American psychologist, logician, and mathematician
- Christine Franklin, American high school sexual abuse victim, plaintiff of Franklin v. Gwinnett County Public Schools
