= 1900 United States census =

12th US national census

Twelfth census of the United States
- June 1, 1900
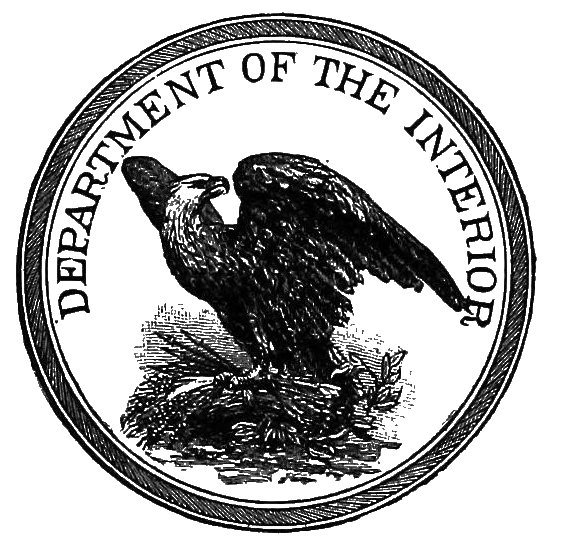
- Seal of the Department of the Interior

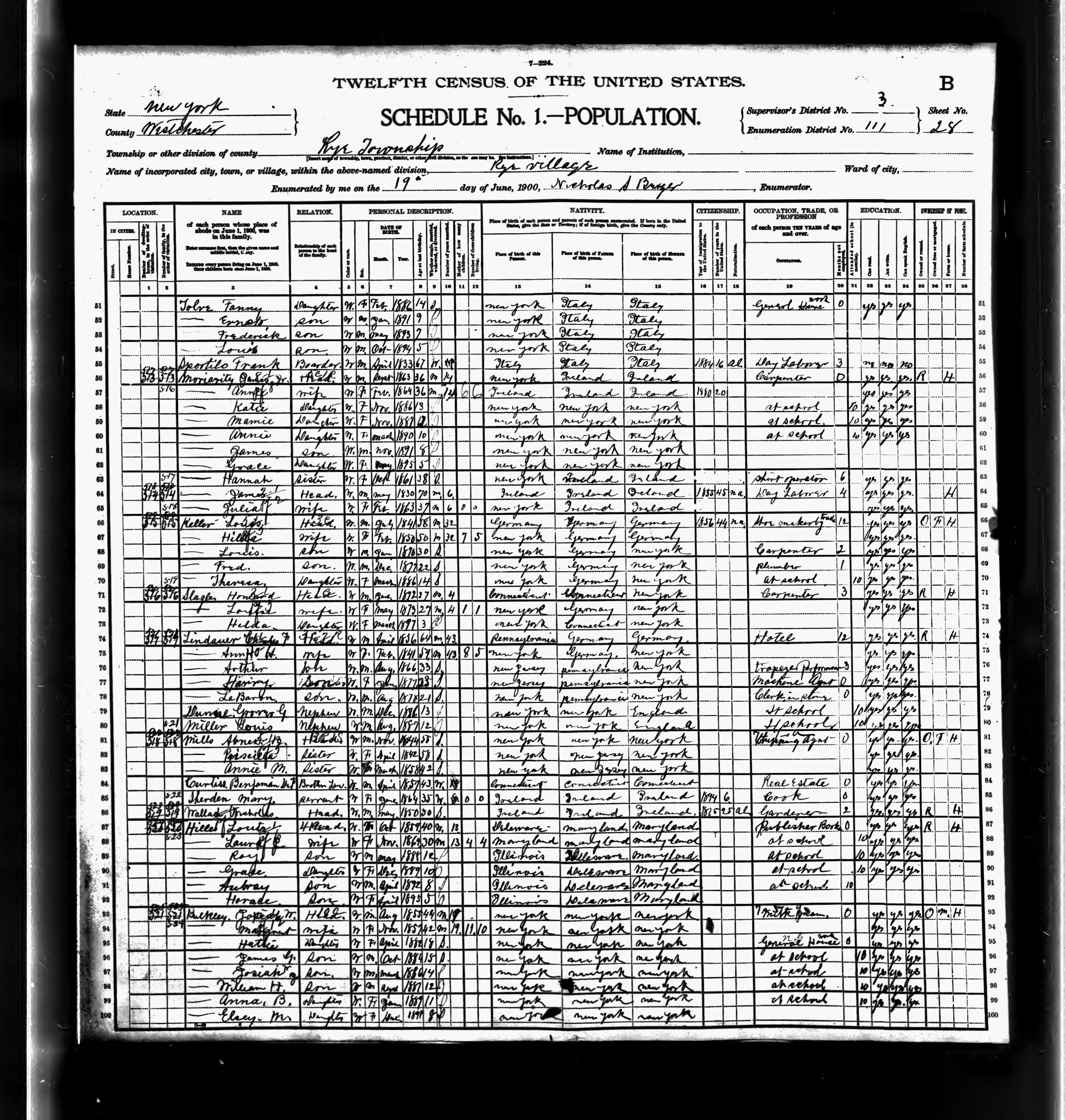
- Population schedule from the 1900 census

General information
- Country: United States
- Authority: Census Office

Results
- Total population: 76,212,168 (▲21.01%)
- Most populous state: New York; 7,268,894
- Least populous state: Nevada; 42,335

The 1900 United States census, conducted by the Census Office on June 1, 1900, determined the resident population of the United States to be 76,212,168, an increase of 21.01% from the 62,979,766 persons enumerated during the 1890 census. It was the last census to be conducted before the founding of the permanent United States Census Bureau.

The census saw the nation's largest city, New York City, more than double in size due to the consolidation with Brooklyn, becoming in the process the first U.S. city to record a population growth of over three million—Brooklyn was previously the 4th largest city in the United States on its own.

Oversight of the statistics was by Frederick Howard Wines and Walter F. Willcox.

== Census questions ==
The 1900 census collected the following information:

- address
- name
- relationship to head of family
- sex
- race (listed as "Color or race" on the census)
- age, month and year born
- marital status and, if married, number of years married
- for women, number of children born and number now living
- place of birth of person, and their parents
- if foreign born, year of immigration and whether naturalized
- occupation
- months not employed
- school
- ability to speak English
- whether on a farm
- home owned or rented, and, if owned, whether mortgaged

Full documentation for the 1900 census, including census forms and enumerator instructions, is available from the Integrated Public Use Microdata Series.

Statistician Frederick Ludwig Hoffman criticized the conduct of the census.

== Data availability ==
The original census enumeration sheets were microfilmed by the Census Bureau in the 1940s, after which the original sheets were destroyed. The microfilmed census is available in rolls from the National Archives and Records Administration. Several organizations also host images of the microfilmed census online, and digital indices.

Microdata from the 1900 census are freely available through IPUMS. Aggregate data for small areas, together with electronic boundary files, can be downloaded from the National Historical Geographic Information System.

== State rankings ==
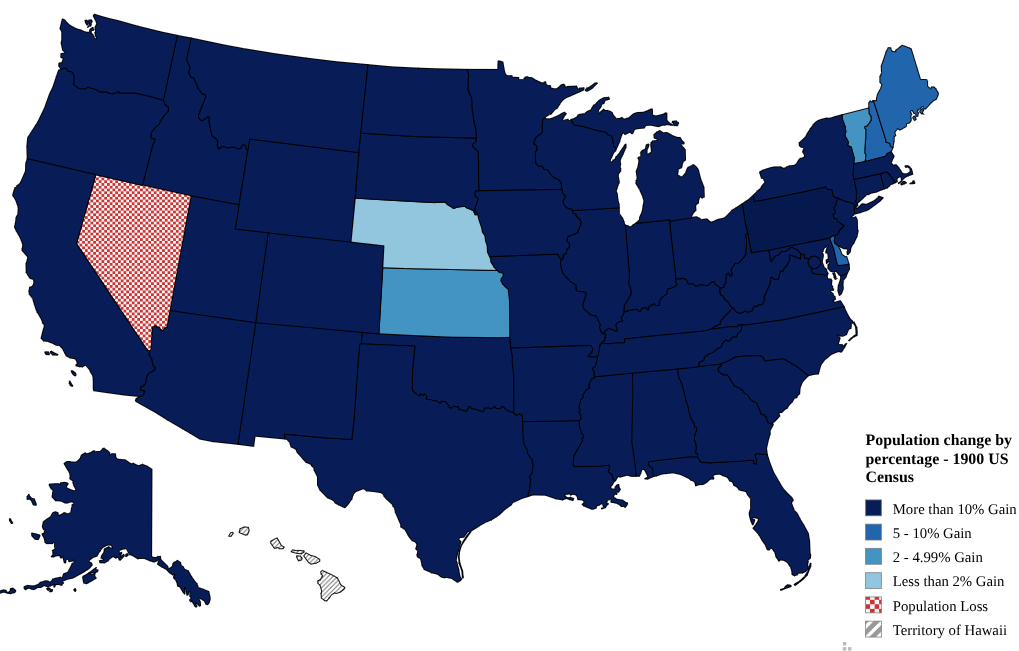
A map showing the population change of each US State by percentage.

Rank	State	Population as of 1900 census	Population as of 1890 census	Change	Percent change
1	New York	7,268,894	6,003,174	1,265,720 ▲	21.1% ▲
2	Pennsylvania	6,302,115	5,258,113	1,044,002 ▲	19.9% ▲
3	Illinois	4,821,550	3,826,352	995,198 ▲	26.0% ▲
4	Ohio	4,157,545	3,672,329	485,216 ▲	13.2% ▲
5	Missouri	3,106,665	2,679,185	427,480 ▲	16.0% ▲
6	Texas	3,048,710	2,235,527	813,183 ▲	36.4% ▲
7	Massachusetts	2,805,346	2,238,947	566,399 ▲	25.3% ▲
8	Indiana	2,516,462	2,192,404	324,058 ▲	14.8% ▲
9	Michigan	2,420,982	2,093,890	327,092 ▲	15.6% ▲
10	Iowa	2,231,853	1,912,297	319,556 ▲	16.7% ▲
11	Georgia	2,216,331	1,837,353	378,978 ▲	20.6% ▲
12	Kentucky	2,147,174	1,858,635	288,539 ▲	15.5% ▲
13	Wisconsin	2,069,042	1,693,330	375,712 ▲	22.2% ▲
14	Tennessee	2,020,616	1,767,518	253,098 ▲	14.3% ▲
15	North Carolina	1,893,810	1,617,949	275,861 ▲	17.0% ▲
16	New Jersey	1,883,669	1,444,933	438,736 ▲	30.4% ▲
17	Virginia	1,854,184	1,655,980	198,204 ▲	12.0% ▲
18	Alabama	1,828,697	1,513,401	315,296 ▲	20.8% ▲
19	Minnesota	1,751,394	1,310,283	441,111 ▲	33.7% ▲
20	Mississippi	1,551,270	1,289,600	261,670 ▲	20.3% ▲
21	California	1,485,053	1,213,398	271,655 ▲	22.4% ▲
22	Kansas	1,470,495	1,428,108	42,387 ▲	3.0% ▲
23	Louisiana	1,381,625	1,118,588	263,037 ▲	23.5% ▲
24	South Carolina	1,340,316	1,151,149	189,167 ▲	16.4% ▲
25	Arkansas	1,311,564	1,128,211	183,353 ▲	16.3% ▲
26	Maryland	1,188,044	1,042,390	145,654 ▲	14.0% ▲
27	Nebraska	1,066,300	1,062,656	3,644 ▲	0.3% ▲
28	West Virginia	958,800	762,794	196,006 ▲	25.7% ▲
29	Connecticut	908,420	746,258	162,162 ▲	21.7% ▲
–	Oklahoma	790,391	258,657	531,734 ▲	205.6% ▲
30	Maine	694,466	661,086	33,380 ▲	5.0% ▲
31	Colorado	539,700	413,249	126,451 ▲	30.6% ▲
32	Florida	528,542	391,422	137,120 ▲	35.0% ▲
33	Washington	518,103	357,232	160,871 ▲	45.0% ▲
34	Rhode Island	428,556	345,506	83,050 ▲	24.0% ▲
35	Oregon	413,536	317,704	95,832 ▲	30.2% ▲
36	New Hampshire	411,588	376,530	35,058 ▲	9.3% ▲
37	South Dakota	401,570	348,600	52,970 ▲	15.2% ▲
38	Vermont	343,641	332,422	11,219 ▲	3.4% ▲
39	North Dakota	319,146	190,983	128,163 ▲	67.1% ▲
–	District of Columbia	278,718	230,392	48,326 ▲	21.0% ▲
40	Utah	276,749	210,779	65,970 ▲	31.3% ▲
41	Montana	243,329	142,924	100,405 ▲	70.3% ▲
–	New Mexico	195,310	160,282	35,028 ▲	21.9% ▲
42	Delaware	184,735	168,493	16,242 ▲	9.6% ▲
43	Idaho	161,772	88,548	73,224 ▲	82.7% ▲
–	Hawaii	154,001	89,990	64,011 ▲	71.1% ▲
–	Arizona	122,931	88,243	34,688 ▲	39.3% ▲
44	Wyoming	92,531	62,555	29,976 ▲	47.9% ▲
–	Alaska	63,592	32,052	31,540 ▲	98.4% ▲
45	Nevada	42,335	47,355	-5,020 ▼	-10.6% ▼
	United States	76,212,168	62,979,766	13,232,402 ▲	21.0% ▲

== City rankings ==
Rank	City	State	Population	Region (2016)
01	New York	New York	3,437,202	Northeast
02	Chicago	Illinois	1,698,575	Midwest
03	Philadelphia	Pennsylvania	1,293,697	Northeast
04	St. Louis	Missouri	575,238	Midwest
05	Boston	Massachusetts	560,892	Northeast
06	Baltimore	Maryland	508,957	South
07	Cleveland	Ohio	391,768	Midwest
08	Buffalo	New York	352,387	Northeast
09	San Francisco	California	342,782	West
10	Cincinnati	Ohio	325,902	Midwest
11	Pittsburgh	Pennsylvania	321,616	Northeast
12	New Orleans	Louisiana	287,104	South
13	Detroit	Michigan	285,704	Midwest
14	Milwaukee	Wisconsin	285,315	Midwest
15	Washington	District of Columbia	278,718	South
16	Newark	New Jersey	246,070	Northeast
17	Jersey City	New Jersey	206,433	Northeast
18	Louisville	Kentucky	204,731	South
19	Minneapolis	Minnesota	202,718	Midwest
20	Providence	Rhode Island	175,597	Northeast
21	Indianapolis	Indiana	169,164	Midwest
22	Kansas City	Missouri	163,752	Midwest
23	Saint Paul	Minnesota	163,065	Midwest
24	Rochester	New York	162,608	Northeast
25	Denver	Colorado	133,859	West
26	Toledo	Ohio	131,822	Midwest
27	Allegheny	Pennsylvania	129,896	Northeast
28	Columbus	Ohio	125,560	Midwest
29	Worcester	Massachusetts	118,421	Northeast
30	Syracuse	New York	108,374	Northeast
31	New Haven	Connecticut	108,027	Northeast
32	Paterson	New Jersey	105,171	Northeast
33	Fall River	Massachusetts	104,863	Northeast
34	St. Joseph	Missouri	102,979	Midwest
35	Omaha	Nebraska	102,555	Midwest
36	Los Angeles	California	102,479	West
37	Memphis	Tennessee	102,320	South
38	Scranton	Pennsylvania	102,026	Northeast
39	Lowell	Massachusetts	94,969	Northeast
40	Albany	New York	94,151	Northeast
41	Cambridge	Massachusetts	91,886	Northeast
42	Portland	Oregon	90,426	West
43	Atlanta	Georgia	89,872	South
44	Grand Rapids	Michigan	87,565	Midwest
45	Dayton	Ohio	85,333	Midwest
46	Richmond	Virginia	85,050	South
47	Nashville	Tennessee	80,865	South
48	Seattle	Washington	80,671	West
49	Hartford	Connecticut	79,850	Northeast
50	Reading	Pennsylvania	78,961	Northeast
51	Wilmington	Delaware	76,508	South
52	Camden	New Jersey	75,935	Northeast
53	Trenton	New Jersey	73,307	Northeast
54	Bridgeport	Connecticut	70,996	Northeast
55	Lynn	Massachusetts	68,513	Northeast
56	Oakland	California	66,960	West
57	Lawrence	Massachusetts	62,559	Northeast
58	New Bedford	Massachusetts	62,442	Northeast
59	Des Moines	Iowa	62,139	Midwest
60	Springfield	Massachusetts	62,059	Northeast
61	Somerville	Massachusetts	61,643	Northeast
62	Troy	New York	60,651	Northeast
63	Hoboken	New Jersey	59,364	Northeast
64	Evansville	Indiana	59,007	Midwest
65	Manchester	New Hampshire	56,987	Northeast
66	Utica	New York	56,383	Northeast
67	Peoria	Illinois	56,100	Midwest
68	Charleston	South Carolina	55,807	South
69	Savannah	Georgia	54,244	South
70	Salt Lake City	Utah	53,531	West
71	San Antonio	Texas	53,321	South
72	Duluth	Minnesota	52,969	Midwest
73	Erie	Pennsylvania	52,733	Northeast
74	Elizabeth	New Jersey	52,130	Northeast
75	Wilkes-Barre	Pennsylvania	51,721	Northeast
76	Kansas City	Kansas	51,418	Midwest
77	Harrisburg	Pennsylvania	50,167	Northeast
78	Portland	Maine	50,145	Northeast
79	Yonkers	New York	47,931	Northeast
80	Norfolk	Virginia	46,624	South
81	Waterbury	Connecticut	45,859	Northeast
82	Holyoke	Massachusetts	45,712	Northeast
83	Fort Wayne	Indiana	45,115	Midwest
84	Youngstown	Ohio	44,885	Midwest
85	Houston	Texas	44,633	South
86	Covington	Kentucky	42,938	South
87	Akron	Ohio	42,728	Midwest
88	Dallas	Texas	42,638	South
89	Saginaw	Michigan	42,345	Midwest
90	Lancaster	Pennsylvania	41,459	Northeast
91	Lincoln	Nebraska	40,169	Midwest
92	Brockton	Massachusetts	40,063	Northeast
93	Binghamton	New York	39,647	Northeast
94	Augusta	Georgia	39,441	South
95	Pawtucket	Rhode Island	39,231	Northeast
96	Altoona	Pennsylvania	38,973	Northeast
97	Wheeling	West Virginia	38,878	South
98	Mobile	Alabama	38,469	South
99	Birmingham	Alabama	38,415	South
100	Little Rock	Arkansas	38,307	South

== Locations of 50 most populous cities ==
Location of 50 largest cities by population in the United States in 1900, on a map of the modern United States.
Numbered Cities
1. Worcester, Massachusetts
2. Paterson, New Jersey
3. Albany, New York
4. Cambridge, Massachusetts
5. Hartford, Connecticut
