= Statistics Surveys =

- Discipline: Statistics
- Language: English
- Edited by: Wendy L. Martinez

Publication details
- History: begun 2007
- Publisher: American Statistical Association, Bernoulli Society, Institute of Mathematical Statistics, Statistical Society of Canada (USA, The Netherlands, USA, Canada)
- Open access: yes

Standard abbreviations
- ISO 4: Stat. Surv.

Indexing
- ISSN: 1935-7516

Links
- Journal homepage

Statistics Surveys is an open-access electronic journal, founded in 2007, that is jointly sponsored by the American Statistical Association, the Bernoulli Society, the Institute of Mathematical Statistics and the Statistical Society of Canada. It publishes review articles on topics of interest in statistics. Wendy L. Martinez serves as the coordinating editor.

== Managing Editors ==
- Jon A. Wellner (2007–2009)
- Lutz Dümbgen (2010–2012)
- Donald Richards (2013–2016)
- David Banks (2017–2019)
- Marloes Maathuis (2020–2022)
- Wendy L. Martinez (2023–)
