= Statistics of Income =

Statistics of Income (SOI) is a program and associated division of the Internal Revenue Service (IRS) in the United States to make statistics collected from income tax returns and information returns available to other government agencies and the general public. It fulfills an IRS function mandated by the Revenue Act of 1916.

== Budget ==
The SOI's annual budget, as of 2017, is $40 million.

== Structure ==
SOI is a division of the IRS with four branches, focusing respectively on:

- Individuals and sole proprietorships
- Corporations and partnerships
- Special studies (include international, tax exempts, and estates)
- Statistical computing, which provides support to the other three Branches, and IRS Operating Division

Each branch has four sections. The three subject-specific Branches each have two sections staffed with economists, one with computer specialists, and one with researchers or information dissemination specialists.

SOI has a Statistical Information Services (SIS), established 1989, that is used to address questions from outside users about SOI products.

== Use by others ==
=== Primary clients ===
The SOI's primary clients, who are both entitled to receive detailed tax returns, are:

- Office of Tax Analysis (OTA) under the United States Department of the Treasury
- United States Congress Joint Committee on Taxation

=== Other federal government clients ===
Other agencies within the federal government that are clients of the SOI program include:

- The Bureau of Economic Analysis (BEA) under the United States Department of Commerce: BEA uses this data as one of its principal data sources for annual updates to the National Income and Product Accounts. Other data sources are surveys conducted by the United States Census Bureau, farm statistics from the United States Department of Agriculture, census data from the Bureau of Labor Statistics, and the federal government annual budget from the Office of Management and Budget.
- The Federal Reserve Board of Governors: The Federal Reserve Board makes use of SOI data to commission the National Opinion Research Center to conduct the Survey of Consumer Finances.
- Government Accountability Office (GAO) (previously known as the General Accounting Office): GAO has published some reports based on Statistics of Income data.
- The Social Security Administration: The SSA uses SOI data, along with many other sources, for its Modeling Income in the Near Term (MINT) model.
- The Centers for Medicare and Medicaid Services (previously known as the Health Care Financing Administration)

=== Others ===
Data from the IRS SOI program is made publicly available on the IRS Tax Stats homepage, and has also historically been available in the form of IRS print publications. The IRS says that the data is used by tax practitioners, policy researchers, demographers, economic analysts, consultants, business associations, state and local governments, universities, public libraries, and the media.

SOI data has been used by the Congressional Research Service, for instance in an analysis of the top tax rates since 1945.

SOI data has been cited in publications of think tanks such as the Tax Policy Center, RAND Corporation, and Cato Institute.

SOI data has also been cited by publications such as the New York Times, the Wall Street Journal, and Forbes.

== History ==
SOI Director	Years served
Edward White	1918–1946
James Turner	1946–1949
Bryce Bratt	1949–1953
Ernest Enquist	1953–1964
Vito Natrella	1964–1980
Fritz Scheuren	1980–1993
Dan Skelly	1993–2001
Tom Petska	2001–2009

=== Legislative mandate (1913, 1916) ===
The Revenue Act of 1913 reintroduced the federal income tax, giving the United States federal government access to income data for individuals and businesses. The Revenue Act of 1916 made some updates to the tax code, and also mandated the publication of statistics of income based on the tax returns filed.

=== Initial work under Edward White (1918–1946) ===
The organization was initially headed by Dr. Edward White, who joined as the head of the SOI program in 1918.

The dates of first publication, under White, are as follows:

Report type	Year for which the earliest data was published	Year in which the earliest data was published
Personal and corporate income tax returns	1916	1918
Sole proprietorships	1917	1919
Estate tax returns	1916–1922	1925
Corporation tax data, in a Source Book	1926	1928
Fiduciary income statistics	1937	1940
Detailed partnership statistics	1939	1945

Around 1928, White took SOI from nonelectric comptometers to punch cards and machine tabulation. He also introduced sampling of individual income tax returns, and later moved to stratified systematic sampling.

Archives from 1916 to 1937 are available via FRASER.

=== James Turner (1946–1949) ===
Turner had a brief tenure before he was promoted to Director of IRS.

=== Bryce Bratt (1949–1953) ===
Bratt extended sampling to corporate tax returns, achieving a sampling rate of 41.5% (285,000 out of 687,000). He faced a backlog of statistical reporting due to the aftereffects of World War II.

=== Ernest Enquist (1953–1964) ===
Enquist doubled SOI staff and also funded half the cost of a Remington Rand UNIVAC I along with the Census Bureau. This was the first computer purchased by the IRS. He doubled SOI staff and reassigned manual statistical processing to the field (with the resources saved through the use of a computer). This allowed SOI to develop its first quality control program and focus on specialized topics such as capital gains and corporate foreign tax credit.

=== Vito Natrella (1964–1980) ===
Natrella, a former Securities and Exchange Commission statistician, increased the use of computers, switched to using integer weights (for greater consistency in reporting and easier data review). Under his leadership, SOI published a one-time study on depletion (for 1960 in 1966), initiated the first SOI estimates of personal wealth based on estate tax returns (for 1962 in 1967), and conducted other such "first" studies.

=== Fritz Scheuren (1980–1993) ===
Under Scheuren's leadership, SOI founded several print publications to better disseminate income statistics, including the Statistics of Income Bulletin (first published 1981) and the SOI methodological report series (started 1982).

Scheuren also instituted the annual program on tax-exempt organizations (based on data such as Form 990 filings). He published the first SOI statistics on employee benefit plans (for 1977 in 1982), and the first compendiums on international income and taxes (1979–1983) and partnerships (1978–1982) in 1985.

In 1989, SOI established the Statistical Information Services (SIS) to answer phone, walk-in, and written requests about SOI products. In 1992, the SOI began disseminating data via electronic bulletin.

While in office, Scheuren was critical of a Reagan administration plan that would require the IRS and Census Bureau to share the data they collected with other government agencies.

=== Dan Skelly (1993–2001) ===
Skelly expanded SOI, increasing the number of annual studies conducted to 60, and recruiting more senior talent to improve the quality of statistics. It was also under his leadership that SOI began its Internet presence.

=== Tom Petska (2001–2009) ===
Under Petska, the SOI program increased its number of reports to 130 semiannual reports, and also improved visibility by presenting at conferences of the American Accounting Association, American Economic Association, American Statistical Association, and National Tax Association. He retired in 2009.
