= Judith Tanur =

American statistician and sociologist (born 1935)

Judith M. Tanur is an American statistician and sociologist who is Distinguished Teaching Professor Emerita of Sociology at Stony Brook University.

Judith Tanur was born to Edward Mark and Libbie Berman Mark on August 12, 1935, in Jersey City, New Jersey. When Tanur was young, her family moved from New Jersey, where she was born, to Great Neck, New York. She graduated from Great Neck High School in 1953 and entered Antioch College, studying psychology and statistics there, but in 1955 she transferred to Columbia University, in part because it was closer to the University of Pennsylvania where her future husband was studying dentistry. At the same time, she took a job at the New York State Psychiatric Institute. Tanur completed a bachelor's degree in psychology in 1957 and began graduate studies at Penn but became pregnant and dropped out. Eventually, she returned to graduate school, completed a master's degree in mathematical statistics from Columbia University in 1963, and took a new job as an editor for William Kruskal at the International Encyclopedia of Social Sciences. She became a lecturer at Stony Brook in 1968, still only holding a master's degree, and later completed her PhD in sociology at Stony Brook.

With S. James Press, she is the author of The Subjectivity of Scientists and the Bayesian Approach (Wiley, 2001; Dover, 2016).

In 1980 she was elected as a Fellow of the American Statistical Association. She is also a fellow of the American Association for the Advancement of Science, a winner of the American Statistical Association Founders Award, and the 2006 winner of the Geoffrey Marshall Mentoring Award of the Northeastern Association of Graduate Schools.
