= Dalene =

Dalene is a female given name. Notable people with the name include:

- Dalene Kurtis (born 1977), Playboy model
- Dalene Matthee (1938–2005), South African author
- Dalene Stangl, American statistician
- Dalene Young, screenwriter for 1980 teen comedy-drama film Little Darlings
