= Jana Asher =

American statistician

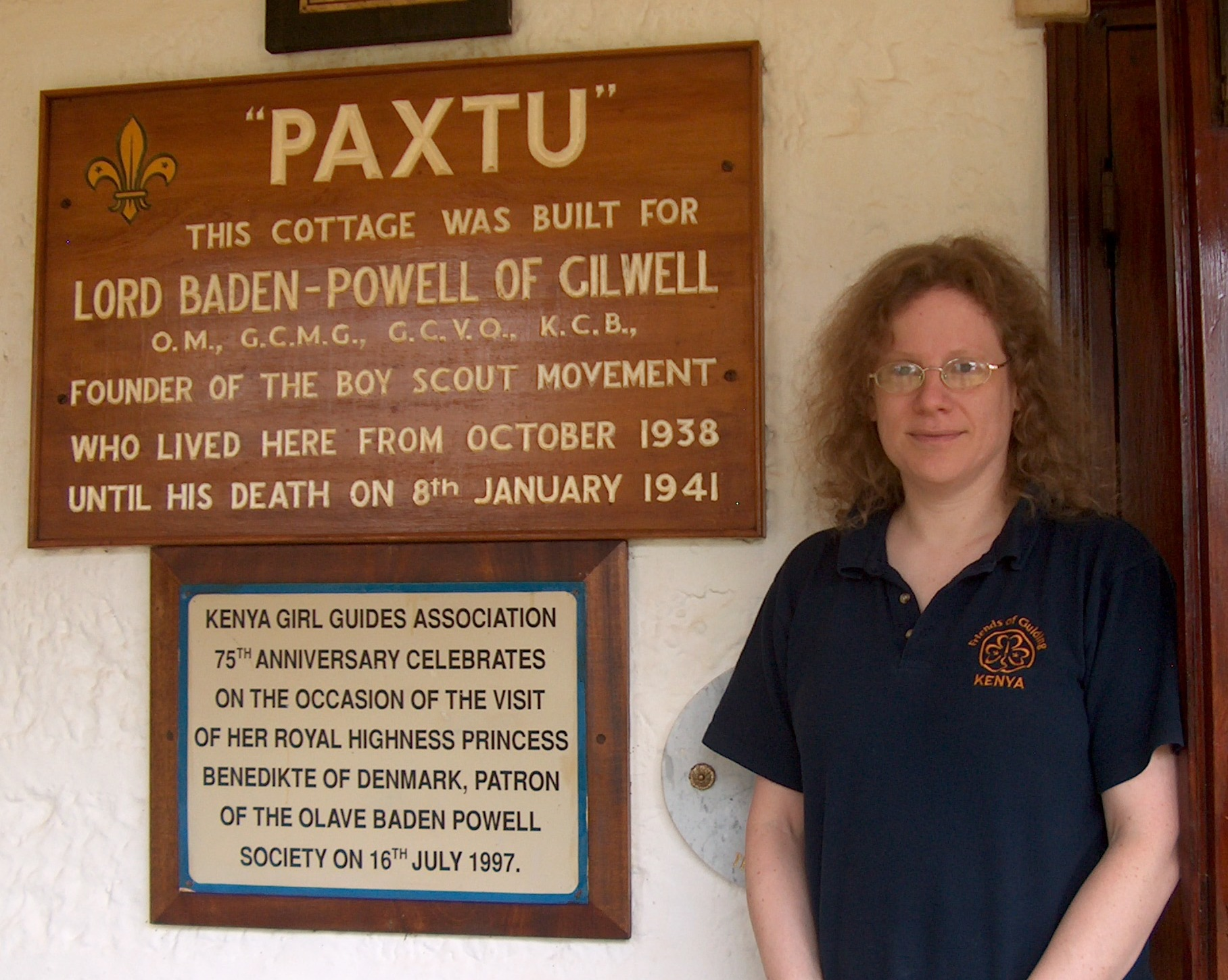
- Jana Asher at the Pax House in Kenya, in 2011
- Citizenship: American
- Education: Carnegie Mellon University
- Scientific career
- Fields: Statistics
- Workplaces: Slippery Rock University
- Doctoral advisor: Stephen Fienberg

Jana Lynn Asher is a statistician known for her work on human rights and sexual violence. She is an Associate Professor of Mathematics and Statistics at Slippery Rock University. She was a co-editor of the book Statistical Methods for Human Rights with David L. Banks and Fritz Scheuren.

Asher volunteers for the American Statistical Association in several roles, including as the Program Chair for 2022 for its Section on Survey Research Methods. She was elected as the Council for Sections Representative to the ASA's Board of Directors for the 2023-25 term. Asher was appointed to be the chair of the Committee on the History of Statistics of the International Statistical Institute.

== Education ==
Asher majored in anthropology and Japanese studies at Wellesley College, graduating in 1991. She earned a master's degree (1999) and Ph.D. (2016) in statistics from Carnegie Mellon University. Her dissertation, Methodological Innovations in the Collection and Analysis of Human Rights Violations Data, was supervised by Stephen Fienberg.

== Recognition ==
Asher was elected as a Fellow of the American Statistical Association in 2009 "for excellence in the application of statistical methodology to human rights and humanitarian measurement problems; for leadership toward placing human rights violations research on a sound statistical basis; and for service to the profession". In 2010 she became an elected member of the International Statistical Institute. In 2022 she received the Caucus for Women in Statistics Societal Impact Award for "her work combating societal injustice through accurate and ethical quantitative measurement, and for her commitment toward teaching civic responsibility and JEDI principles through statistical practice." JEDI stands for "Justice, Equity, Diversity, and Inclusion."
