= Linda J. Young =

American statistician

- Born: December 24, 1952 (age 73); White Deer, Texas, USA
- Spouse: Jerry H. Young
- Awards: American Statistical Association Founders Award

Academic background
- Education: BSc, 1974, MSc, 1976, West Texas State University; PhD, 1981, Oklahoma State University
- Thesis: Estimation and Testing Procedures for the Parameters of the Negative Binomial Distribution (1981)

Linda Jean Young (nee Willson; born December 24, 1952) is an American statistician. She is the chief mathematical statistician and director of research and development at the National Agricultural Statistics Service. Her research interests include integrating diverse data, especially that involving spatial data, agricultural data, and statistical ecology.

== Early life and education ==
Young was born on December 24, 1952 in White Deer, Texas, USA. Young earned her Bachelor's degree and Master's degree in mathematics from West Texas State University and her PhD in statistics from Oklahoma State University in 1981.

In 2018, Young was inducted into Oklahoma State University's Hall of Fame.

== Career ==
Upon completing her PhD, Young accepted faculty positions at Oklahoma State University, the University of Nebraska–Lincoln, and the University of Florida. In 1994, Young was elected a Fellow of the American Statistical Association. In 2008, she was named the recipient of the American Statistical Association Founders Award. While at the University of Florida, Young was elected a Fellow of the American Association for the Advancement of Science "for her work with the development of statistical methods in environmental, agricultural and health sciences."

Young left Florida in 2013 to become the chief mathematical statistician at the National Agricultural Statistics Service (NASS). In this role, she oversaw the first publication by the NASS on measures of uncertainty for all its census estimates.

== Personal life ==
Young and her husband Jerry have three children together.
