= Albert Madansky =

American statistician (1934–2022)

- Born: 16 May 1934; Chicago
- Died: 8 December 2022 (aged 88); Chicago
- Citizenship: American
- Education: University of Chicago
- Occupation: Statistician
- Known for: Work in Statistics

Albert Madansky (May 16, 1934 - December 8, 2022) was an American statistician known for his work in stock option pricing and the prediction of an accidental nuclear detonation. Alongside Gary L. Gastineau, he developed the Gastineau-Madansky model for stock option pricing and later co-authored the Edmundson-Madansky theorem (which falls in the field of stochastic linear programming). Some of his early research at RAND Corporation was used to develop Permissive Action Links, which help mitigate a nuclear accident. Madansky served as deputy dean of the University of Chicago Booth School of Business from 1985 to 1993. He was also known for his efforts with other scholars to determine the best pastrami sandwich among the Kosher delis of New York City. He was the grandfather of linguist Harris Mowbray.

In 2005 Madansky was recipient of the American Statistical Association's Founders Award.
