= John Neter =

American statistician (1923–2022)

John Neter (February 8, 1923 – December 6, 2022) was a German-born American statistician, university professor, and widely published author.

Growing up in Germany, he was a classmate of Henry Kissinger.

He spent much of his career teaching statistics at University of Georgia in Athens, Georgia.

In 1965 he was elected as a Fellow of the American Statistical Association. He served as President of the American Statistical Association in 1985. In 1990 Neter was awarded the American Statistical Association's Founders Award.

== Bibliography ==
- Michael H. Kutner, John Neter, Christopher J. Nachtsheim, William Li, Applied Linear Statistical Models, (McGraw-Hill College, January 2004)
- Michael H. Kutner, John Neter, Christopher J. Nachtsheim, William Li, Applied Linear Regression Models, (McGraw-Hill College, May 2004)
- John Neter, Student Solutions Manual for Use With Applied Linear Regression Models (3rd) and Applied Linear Statistical Model (4th), (McGraw-Hill College, December 1996)
- John Neter, Michael H. Kutner, William Wasserman, Christopher J. Nachtscheim, Applied Linear Regression Models, (McGraw-Hill College, January 1996)
- Michael H. Kutner, John Neter, Christopher J. Nachtsheim, Solutions Manual for Applied Linear Regression Models, (McGraw-Hill College, January 2003)
- John Neter, G.A. Whitmore, William Wasserman, Applied Statistics, (Prentice Hall, February 1992)
- John Neter, Michael H. Kutner, William Wasserman, Applied Linear Statistical Models: Regression, Analysis of Variance, and Experimental Designs, (McGraw-Hill, July 1990)
- John Neter, James Loebbecke, Behavior of Major Statistical Estimators in Sampling Accounting Populations, (American Institute of Certified Public Accountants, June 1975)
