= Julia Sharp =

American statistician

Julia Lynn Sharp is an American mathematical statistician in the Applied and Computational Statistics Group at the National Institute of Standards and Technology in Fort Collins, Colorado, with expertise in the scientific applications of statistical problems involving longitudinal data, uncertainty analysis, mixed models, and the design of experiments.

== Education and career ==
Sharp majored in mathematics at the University of Evansville in Indiana, graduating in 1998. She went to Montana State University for graduate study in statistics, earning a master's degree in 2001 and completing her Ph.D. in 2007. During her graduate studies she also interned at the Pacific Northwest National Laboratory. Her dissertation, New Statistical Methods for Analyzing Proteomics Data from Affinity Isolation LC-MS/MS Experiments, was supervised by John J. Borkowski Jr.

She became an assistant professor at Clemson University in 2007, and was promoted to associate professor in 2013. In 2016 she moved to Colorado State University as associate professor and director of the Graybill Statistical Laboratory; she added an affiliation as adjunct faculty in biostatistics and informatics at the Colorado School of Public Health in 2018, and was promoted to full professor in 2022. In 2023 she moved to her present position at the National Institute of Standards and Technology.

Sharp is also a member of the Human Subjects Review Board for the United States Environmental Protection Agency since 2019, and has worked with the American Statistical Association to develop a set of educational videos on statistical collaborations in the sciences. She has held many leadership positions within the American Statistical Association, including chairing its Justice, Equity, Diversity, and Inclusion Outreach Group in 2020.

== Recognition ==
Sharp was the 2021 recipient of the Outstanding Mentor Award of the Statistical Consulting Section of the American Statistical Association. She was named a Fellow of the American Statistical Association in 2022 "for excellent and sustained collaboration that advances the development and practice of statistics; for exceptional mentoring and teaching of statisticians and researchers using statistical methods; and for unparalleled service to the ASA and profession".

As a participant in the NCCC170 project, coordinating research in agricultural statistics, she was a recipient of the 2021 American Society of Agronomy Presidential Award, presented to "all of the NCCC-170 and Experiment Station Statisticians".

In 2024 Sharp was recipient of the American Statistical Association's Founders Award.
