= Dionne Price =

African-American statistician (1971-2024)

- Born: August 29, 1971
- Died: February 22, 2024 (aged 52)
- Occupation: Statistician for US Food and Drug Administration
- Known for: First African-American president of the American Statistical Association (ASA)

Academic background
- Education: Norfolk State University (BS) University of North Carolina (MS) Emory University (PhD)
- Thesis: Survival Models for Heterogeneous Populations with Cure

Dionne L. Price (29 August 1971 – 22 February 2024) was an American statistician and first African-American president of the American Statistical Association (ASA), the world's largest professional body representing statisticians. Price worked as a division director in the Office of Biostatistics of the Center for Drug Evaluation and Research, in the US Food and Drug Administration. Her division provided statistical advice "used in the regulation of anti-infective, anti-viral, ophthalmology, and transplant drug products".

== Education and career ==
Price was African-American, and grew up in Portsmouth, Virginia; her mother was a schoolteacher. She majored in applied mathematics at Norfolk State University, earned a master's degree from the University of North Carolina, and completed her Ph.D. at Emory University in 2000. Her dissertation, Survival Models for Heterogeneous Populations with Cure, was supervised by Amita Manatunga, and with it she became the first African-American to earn a doctorate in biostatistics at Emory. After finishing her doctorate, she joined the Food and Drug Administration. She helped establish the U.S. FDA's Complex Innovative Trial Design Pilot Meeting Program, which encouraged the use of Bayesian and other novel clinical trial designs in order to advance new and innovative trial designs in drug development.

== Recognition ==
Price was the keynote speaker at StatFest 2016, a one-day conference at Howard University organized by the ASA Committee on Minorities in Statistics to encourage statistical students from underrepresented groups. She was elected as a Fellow of the ASA in 2018. She was "elected the 118th president of the American Statistical Association (ASA). She served a one-year term as president-elect beginning January 1, 2022; her term as president became effective January 1, 2023. She was elected to the 2022 class of Fellows of the American Association for the Advancement of Science (AAAS). Price was the first African-American president of the ASA, serving for a year from 1 January 2023." In 2024 Price was recipient of the American Statistical Association's Founders Award.

In 2024, the ASA established the Dionne Price Public Lecture Series, which features groundbreaking early-career statisticians and data scientists. In 2025, the inaugural Dionne Price Public Lecture was delivered by Claire McKay Bowen.
