= Lorraine Denby =

American statistician and Civil Air Patrol pilot

Lorraine Denby is a retired American statistician, formerly affiliated with Bell Labs and Avaya, and a lieutenant colonel in the Civil Air Patrol.

== Education and career ==
Denby has a 1971 master's degree in statistics from the University of Michigan. She listed her affiliation with Bell Labs on statistics publications with dates ranging from 1976 to 1999. During this time, she also completed a Ph.D. in statistics at the University of Michigan in 1984, with the dissertation Smooth Regression Functions (Partial Residual Plots) supervised by Edward D. Rothman. By 2002, she was working for Avaya Labs Research; she has subsequently retired. In her retirement, she consults as a principal for Murray Hill Data Science.

== Professional recognition ==
Denby was elected as a Fellow of the American Statistical Association in 1991. She was one of three 1997 recipients of the American Statistical Association Founders Award for distinguished service to the association.

In 2014, she was part of a team of three researchers at Avaya that won the Edison Award of the R&D Council of New Jersey, for their patented research on localizing problems in networks carrying multimedia data.

== Aviation ==
As a teenager in Michigan in 1967, Denby was selected to become a cadet in the Civil Air Patrol through a program that chose one participant from each US state for a month of flight training; she was the only girl in the program. She continues to serve in the Civil Air Patrol as a lieutenant colonel, as a flight instructor, as NJ Wing Emergency Services Training Officer, and as a pilot and surrogate target in training exercises.

In 2020, she was involved in a flight incident while training a student pilot, when their plane clipped a tree and crash-landed. She was part of a three-person team that competed in a one-day women's air derby in 2021, placing seventh. She was both a director of and a competitor in the 2024 Air Race Classic, a transcontinental air race for female pilots. Her personal airplane is a Piper Arrow, and she is also active in the Ninety-Nines, an organization of women pilots.
