= Peter A. Lachenbruch =

American statistician (1937–2021)

Peter Anthony Lachenbruch (1937 – July 29, 2021) was an American statistician. He was professor emeritus at Oregon State University. He had previously worked at the Center for Biologics Evaluation and Research (CBER) at the Food and Drug Administration (FDA) where he was director of the division of biostatistics. He was a fellow and former president of the American Statistical Association (ASA).

== Education ==
Lachenbruch earned his BA in mathematics from the University of California, Los Angeles (UCLA) (1958) and his MS in mathematics from Lehigh University (1961). He earned his PhD from UCLA in 1965. He wrote his thesis, Estimation of Error Rates in Discriminant Analysis under the tutelage of M. Ray Mickey.

== Career ==
After completing his PhD, Lachenbruch held a number of academic positions at the University of North Carolina (1965 to 1976), University of Iowa (1976 to 1985) and UCLA (1985 to 1994). He was chair of biostatistics in the school of public health at UCLA. In 1994 Lachenbruch joined CBER where he was Chief, Biostatistics, Division of Biostatistics and Epidemiology from 1994 to 1999 and then Director, Division of Biostatistics (1999 to 2006). After his career at the FDA, Lachenbruch joined the Department of Public Health, Oregon State University in 2006, where he stayed until his retirement.

During his career, he wrote a text on discriminant analysis and published over 200 refereed articles.

In addition to his academic and government appointments, Lachenbruch was president of the Eastern North American Region (ENAR) of the International Biometric Society (1984), of the American Statistical Association (2008) and of the Western North American Region (WNAR) of the International Biometrics Society (2010).

== Honors and awards ==
In 1971, Lachenbruch was awarded the Mortimer Spiegelman Award by the American Public Health Association He was elected a fellow of the American Statistical Association in 1979 and was an elected member of the International Statistical Institute.

== Selected publications ==
=== Books ===
- Lachenbruch, Peter A. (1975). Discriminant Analysis. New York, NY: Hafner Press. ISBN 978-0-02-848250-7.

=== Journal articles ===
- Lachenbruch, Tony (2005). "Memories of Stata". The Stata Journal: Promoting Communications on Statistics and Stata. 5: 38. doi:10.1177/1536867X0500500106.
