= Nancy Kirkendall =

American government statistician

Nancy Jean Isner Kirkendall is an American government statistician, a Fellow of the American Statistical Association, and a past president of the Washington Statistical Society.

== Education and career ==
Kirkendall majored in mathematics at the Ohio State University, and continued at Ohio State for a master's degree in mathematics. She received a Ph.D. in mathematical statistics at George Washington University in 1974. Her dissertation, Large Sample Finite Approximations in an Infinite Dimension Distributed Lag Regression Model, was supervised by Robert H. Shumway.

She has worked at the United States Census Bureau, and for the Office of Management and Budget as a senior statistician in the Statistical Policy Branch of the Office of Information and Regulatory Affairs. She directed the Statistics and Methods Group of the Energy Information Administration, retiring in 2008, before becoming a senior program officer in the Committee on National Statistics of the National Academies of Sciences, Engineering, and Medicine.

She has chaired the Federal Committee on Statistical Methodology, and served as vice president of the American Statistical Association. She was president of the Washington Statistical Society for 1987–1988.

== Recognition ==
Kirkendall was elected as a Fellow of the American Statistical Association in 1993.

She was the 2000 recipient of the American Statistical Association Founders Award, and the 2007 recipient of its Roger Herriot Award for Innovation in Federal Statistics.
