= Churchill Eisenhart =

American mathematician (1913–1994)

Churchill Eisenhart (March 11, 1913 – June 25, 1994) was an American mathematician and statistician. He was Chief of the Statistical Engineering Laboratory (SEL), Applied Mathematics Division of the National Bureau of Standards (NBS).

== Biography ==
Eisenhart was born in Rochester, New York as the son of Luther Eisenhart, a prominent mathematician in his own right. He spent his childhood in Princeton, New Jersey and studied at Princeton University starting from 1930. Eisenhart obtained an A.B. in mathematical physics from Princeton in 1934 and an A.M. in mathematics. He was recommended to study statistics in London and obtained his PhD under Jerzy Neyman at University College London in 1937. Eisenhart became a professor of mathematics at the University of Wisconsin in 1937. During World War II, he worked at Tufts University and Columbia University on the statistical aspects of aerial combat.

Eisenhart was brought to the NBS from the University of Wisconsin–Madison in 1946 by Edward Condon, Director of the NBS, to establish a statistical consulting group to "substitute sound mathematical analysis for costly experimentation." He was allowed to recruit his own staff and, over the years, he brought many notable and accomplished statisticians to SEL. He served as its Chief from 1947 until his appointment as Senior Research Fellow in 1963. He retired in 1983 after which he formed the Standards Alumni Association, which he headed until his death in 1994.

Over his career, Eisenhart was awarded the U.S. Department of Commerce Exceptional Service Award in 1957; the Rockefeller Public Service Award in 1958; and the Wildhack Award of the National Conference of Standards Laboratories in 1982. He was elected President of the American Statistical Association (ASA) in 1971 and received the Association's Wilks Memorial Medal in 1977. Eisenhart was honored with an Outstanding Achievements Award of the Princeton University Class of 1934 and with Fellowships in the ASA, the American Association for the Advancement of Science, and the Institute of Mathematical Sciences. He was a long-time member of the Cosmos Club.

== External sources ==
- Obituary in the Washington Post
- Churchill Eisenhart on the page Portraits of Statisticians
- Samuel S. Wilks Award Citation for 1977
- An interview with Joseph Daly and Churchill Eisenhart about their experiences at Princeton 10 July 1984
- [https://web.archive.org/web/20150310072117/http://www.princeton.edu/~mud
- NIST. "Realistic Evaluation of the Precision and Accuracy of Instrument Calibration Systems". Archived from the original on 2006-02-16.d/finding_aids/mathoral/pmc09.htm An interview with Churchill Eisenhart about his experience at Princeton 10 July 1984]
