= I. Richard Savage =

American statistician (1925–2004)

I. Richard Savage in 1966

I. Richard Savage (October 26, 1925 – June 4, 2004) was an American statistician who specialized in population censuses. He was professor emeritus and former chair of statistics at Yale University. He was an elected fellow of the American Statistical Association, the American Association for the Advancement of Science and of the Institute of Mathematical Statistics.

== Education ==
Savage earned his BS from the University of Chicago and his MSc from the University of Michigan. He earned a PhD in statistics from Columbia University in 1954 where he studied under the tutelage of Howard Levene. His thesis was titled: Contributions to the Theory of Rank Order Statistics. His early research continued his work on nonparametric statistics, especially rank order statistics.

== Career ==
Savage's first position after completing his PhD was as a mathematical statistician at the National Bureau of Standards (now the National Institute of Standards and Technology), where he published his PhD thesis. He then had a number of university faculty positions, including Stanford University, Harvard Business School, Imperial College London, University of Minnesota, and Florida State University. In 1974, he joined the Department of Statistics at Yale University where he stayed until his retirement in 1990. He was chair of the department from 1976 to 1978.

== Recognition and service ==
Savage was elected a fellow of the American Statistical Association, the American Association for the Advancement of Science and of the Institute of Mathematical Statistics. He was co-editor of both the Journal of the American Statistical Association and the Annals of Statistics. In 1984, he was president of the American Statistical Association. In 1993, he was presented with the American Statistical Association Founders Award.

== Personal life ==
While studying for his PhD, Savage met JoAnn Osherow. They married in 1950 and had two daughters. Savage was the brother of Leonard Jimmie Savage.

Savage contracted polio in 1945 that left him legally blind and needing the use of a wheelchair. He died from post-polio syndrome in 2004. He was 78 years old.

== Selected publications ==
- Savage, I Richard (1954). Contributions to the theory of rank order statistics (Report). Gaithersburg, MD: National Bureau of Standards. doi:10.6028/NBS.RPT.3262.
- Chernoff, Herman; Savage, I. Richard (1958). "Asymptotic Normality and Efficiency of Certain Nonparametric Test Statistics". The Annals of Mathematical Statistics. 29 (4): 972–994. doi:10.1214/aoms/1177706436.
