= S. N. D. North =

American statistician

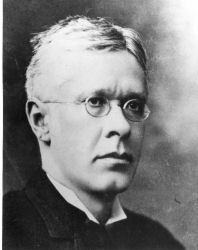
- Born: 1848; Clinton, New York, U.S.
- Died: 1924 (aged 75–76); Connecticut, U.S.
- Scientific career
- Fields: Statistician
- Workplaces: United States Census Bureau

Simon Newton Dexter (S. N. D.) North (1848-1924) was an American statistician and the second director of the United States Census Bureau. He served as President of the American Statistical Association in 1910. In 1914 he became one of the inaugural Fellows of the American Statistical Association.

Earlier he had been Secretary of the National Association of Wool Manufacturers.

North was chosen to head the 12th census in 1900. After Herman Hollerith's electromechanical tabulating machine was first used in the 11th census, it allowed North's administration to extend the census method to the field of agriculture and manufacture. Sharing the worries about the influx of immigrants with other upper-class Americans and colleagues of his day, like Francis Walker, North praised Hollerith's tabulator machine as an enabler in "[coping] successfully with the problems growing out of the heterogeneous commingling of races" which "has been a powerful influence in the rapid disappearance of the Puritanical outlook upon life".
