= Fang Liu (statistician) =

Chinese-American statistician and data scientist

Fang Liu is a Chinese-American statistician and data scientist whose research topics include differential privacy, data synthesis, trustworthy statistical learning, Bayesian statistics, regularization, missing data, and applications in biostatistics. She is a Notre Dame Collegiate professor in the Department of Applied and Computational Mathematics and Statistics at the University of Notre Dame.

== Education and career ==
Liu was talented in mathematics as a child, competed in mathematics competitions, and wanted to become a mathematician, but was discouraged from doing so by her parents, who wanted her to become a physician. As a compromise, she studied biology at Peking University, where she earned a bachelor's degree in 1997.

She began her graduate studies at Iowa State University intending to study genetics, but quickly switched to a program in statistics, and earned a master's degree there in 1999, and a Ph.D. from the University of Michigan in 2003. Her dissertation, Bayesian Methods for Statistical Disclosure Control in Microdata, involved both data privacy and Bayesian statistics, and was supervised by Roderick J. A. Little.

After completing her doctorate, she became a researcher at the Merck Research Laboratories. She returned to academia, joining the Notre Dame faculty, in 2011. Her doctoral students at Notre Dame have included Claire McKay Bowen.

== Recognition ==
Liu was named a Fellow of the American Statistical Association in 2021, "for novel contributions to differentially private synthetic data and Bayesian modeling; for outstanding interdisciplinary research in clinical and public health studies; for leadership in education and training; and for service to the profession". Liu became an Elected Member of the International Statistical Institute in 2024.
