= Howard Levene =

American statistician and geneticist

- Born: January 17, 1914; New York City, New York
- Died: July 2, 2003 (aged 89); New York City, New York
- Education: New York University; Columbia University
- Known for: Levene's test
- Scientific career
- Fields: Genetics; Statistics
- Institutions: Columbia University
- Thesis: Contributions to the Theory of Non-Parametric Tests of Randomness (1953)
- Doctoral advisor: Jacob Wolfowitz
- Doctoral students: William Kruskal; Bonnie Ray; I. Richard Savage

Howard Levene (January 17, 1914 – July 2, 2003) was an American statistician and geneticist. He received his Ph.D. from Columbia University in 1947, and joined the faculty there shortly thereafter. He remained on the faculty at Columbia, where he served as professor of mathematical statistics and genetics, until 1982. In statistics he is known for developing Levene's test, a modified form of the one-way analysis of variance. His main contribution to population genetics is referred to, as "Levene's model". It was the very first population genetic model, which incorporated existence of more than one ecological niche. He served as president of the American Society of Naturalists in 1976. Levene also is the namesake for a teaching award in Columbia's Department of Statistics, the Howard Levene Outstanding Teaching Award awarded since 1999.
