= Malcolm C. Rorty =

American economist

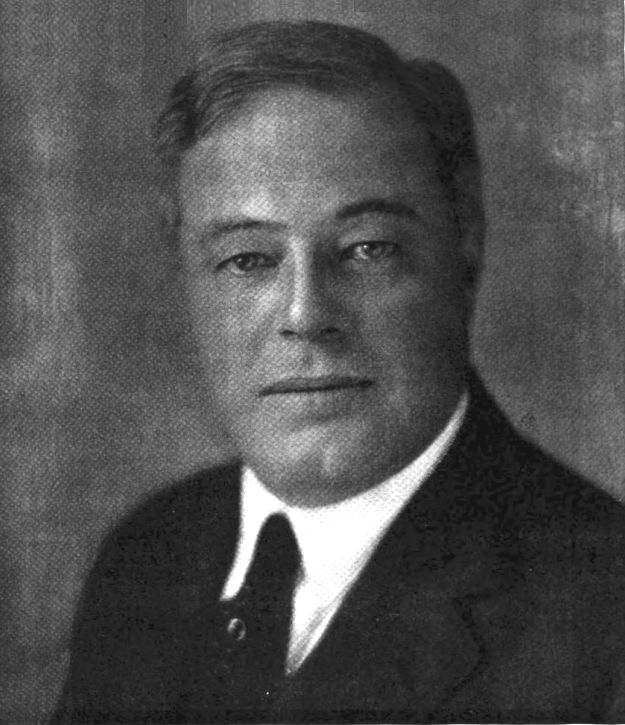
Malcolm C. Rorty, 1921

Malcolm Churchill Rorty (1875 – January 18, 1937) was an American engineer, economist, statistician and manager for the American Telephone and Telegraph Company. He is known as one of the founding members of the Econometric Society, and co-founder of the National Bureau of Economic Research, and in 1931 was elected presidents of the American Statistical Association. Rorty wrote numerous monographs on economic topics in which he opposed an "ultra-conservative viewpoint", and defended "a laissez-faire approach to business".

== Biography ==
Born in Paterson, New Jersey, Rorty attended the common schools, and Walkill Academy, Middletown, New York. He studied mechanical and electrical engineering and graduated from the Cornell University in 1896.

After graduation in 1896 Rorty started his 27 years long career at the Bell Telephone Company as telephone installer. After becoming switchboard repairman, and wire chief, he entered the general office in 1899 where he became traffic engineer. In 1903, he was appointed superintendent of traffic at Pittsburgh of the Central District Telephone Company, later becoming general superintendent. In 1910, he came to New York to organize the commercial engineering department of the American Telephone & Telegraph Company, of which he became chief statistician. In World War I he served at the Inter-allied Munition Council and officer of the General Staff, and was promoted to the rank of lieutenant colonel.

In 1918 back at Bell Telephone Company he was appointed chief statistician at the American Telephone and Telegraph Company, and in 1921 was promoted to Vice President of the Bell Telephone Securities Company and elected as a Fellow of the American Statistical Association. In 1924 he moved to the International Telephone and Telegraph, where he served until his retirement in 1930.

In 1920 Rorty co-founded the National Bureau of Economic Research, and he served as its second president in 1922. He also co-founded the Econometric Society in 1930, and served as presidents of the American Statistical Association in 1931–32, and as president of the American Management Association from 1934 until his death on 18 January 1937.

== Work ==
Rorty came into prominence writing a "pioneer paper on the application of probability theory to telephone problems in October 1903" which was later used in the design of automatic telephone systems. His later works were mostly on economic topics in which he defended "a laissez-faire approach to business."

=== National Bureau of Economic Research ===
NBER Logo

In 1920 Rorty co-founded the National Bureau of Economic Research (NBER) with N.I. Stone, formerly Chief of the United States Tariff Board. They had met as opponent advisers in the debate on the unemployment program and legislation for minimum wage in the state of New York. They later decided to join forces to initiate "an organization that devoted itself to fact finding on controversial economic subjects of great public interests."

After seeking advice of economists, such as Edwin F. Gay, Wesley Clair Mitchell, and John R. Commons, they proceeded seeking private funding for their research program. Their effort was interrupted by the First World War, and continued in the early 1920. Later in 1920 the institute took off directed by Wesley Mitchell. The research program of the Bureau foresaw long-term statistical analyses on national income and its distribution. A theoretical structure was developed for national income estimated with the help of staff members, such as Simon Kuznets.

Rorty and Mitchell foresaw a missionary potential as Mitchell (1922) declared, that "the practical demonstration we have given that men of otherwise divergent views can unite in the scientific investigation of controverted social facts will give a powerful stimulus to all movements like ours."

=== Business barometers ===
One of Rorty's contributions was in the field of business barometers, assessments of stocks, business reports and other economic developments. This concept was first published by Roger Babson in 1907. Catlin (1962) explained:

Roger W. Babson first published his Business Barometers during the crisis of 1907 during the crisis of 1907, and assured those who followed his chart, based on the Newtonian law of action and reaction, that they would "slowly but surely create for their institutions and for themselves huge fortunes..."

About Rorty's contribution Catlin (1962) explained, that "Rorty, developed its index of general business conditions in the United States, as a guide to its executives in making plans and decisions. Drawing data from various sources running back to 1877 and subject to correction from time to time, this includes such criteria as pig-iron production, steel orders, car loadings, coal output, paper production, etc.

=== Business cycles ===
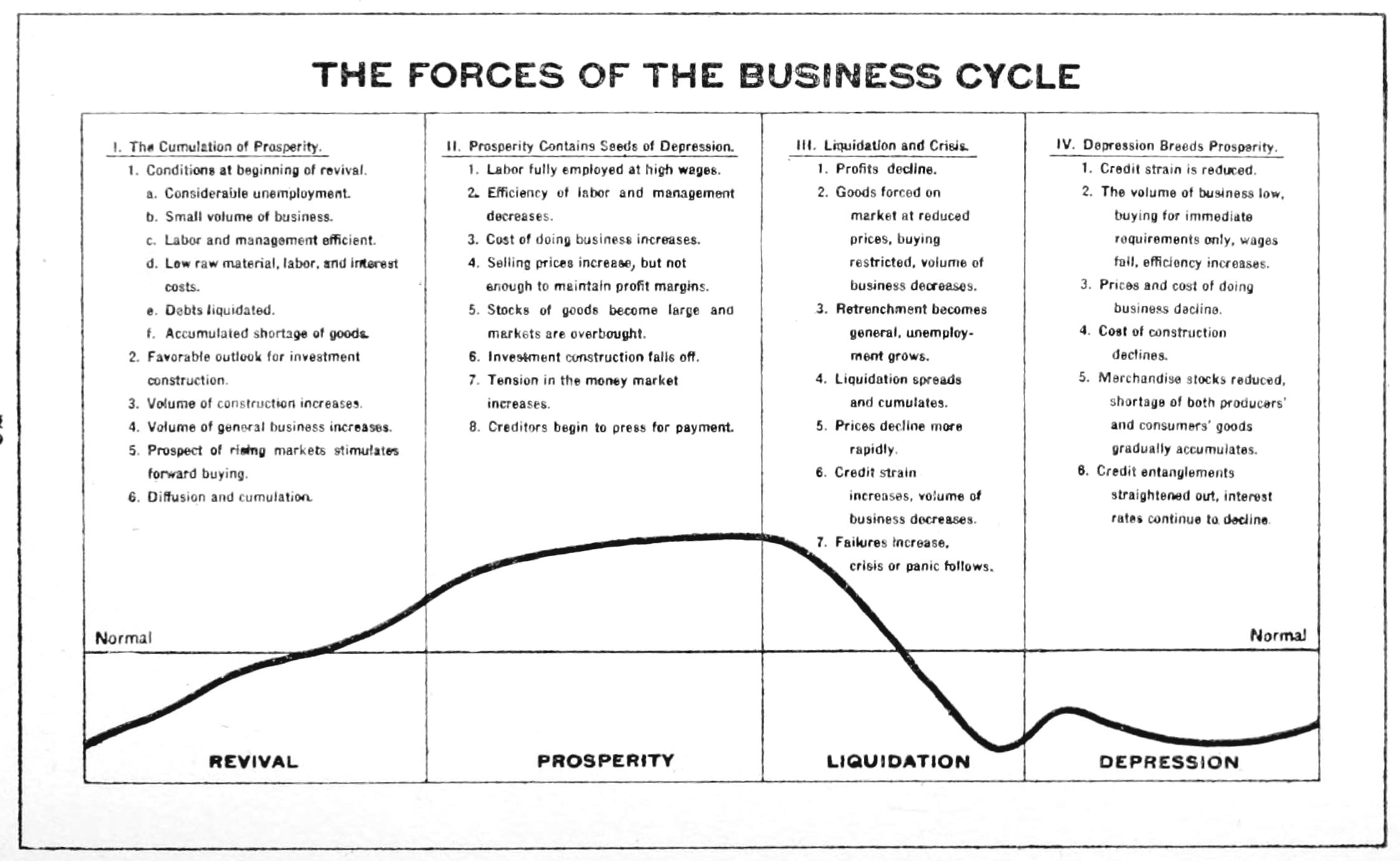
The forces of the business cycle, 1922

Rorty was inspired by the early work Wesley Clair Mitchell had published on business cycles, and in the 1920s became involved in specifying the processes involved in business cycles. The introduction to a 1921 interview with Rorty on this subject characterized the state of the art by then as follows:

Economic subjects subjects have become such a matter of popular interest that even the “man on the street” knows in a general way that business moves in cycles. He knows that when statisticians make a map or rather present a picture of business variations covering a period of years the portrait is a snaky curve that undulates up and down across an imaginary normal line, with peaks representing “prosperity” and valleys representing “hard times.“ The typical cycle, or one undulation of the snake, is shown in the accompanying diagram, which is the work of one of Colonel Rorty’s associates.

About the role of Rorty in the ongoing debate on specifying the processes involved in business cycles, Mitchell (1926) explained:

Colonel Malcolm C. Rorty has suggested that the over-construction theory should be expanded into an "over-commitment" theory, and strengthened by analysis of financial processes. At an early stage in many periods of prosperity, he points out, simultaneous overcommitments to business extensions and new ventures are made in most, if not in all, branches of industry. Each such commitment involves the creation, through credit extensions, of new purchasing power. Since the additional purchasing power is not offset promptly by a corresponding increase in production, prices rise. This process of extending commitments, expanding credit and raising prices continues until it is checked by shortage of credit facilities, or until prices have reached a level at which experienced business men see danger in making further additions to their stocks of goods. Then comes a contraction of purchases, and a crisis.

And furthermore:

Such are the essential features of a typical boom and crisis, arising from causes inherent in the business organization. But Colonel Rorty adds that we have cycles of two other types. The milder periods of prosperity and recession arise from mere current readjustments of production, distribution and consumption. Still other cycles arise primarily from non-business causes, such as wars. Admitting that sometimes it is difficult to decide to which of these three types a given case belongs, Colonel Rorty holds that this classification clarifies the problem, and explains why no one theory accounts in satisfactory fashion for all cycles.

=== Graphic methods for presenting business statistics ===
In his days Rorty developed into an expert into the visualization of quantitative data. In his 1922 Some Problems in Current Economics he had already presented a range of statistical data in a series of charts (see gallery below):

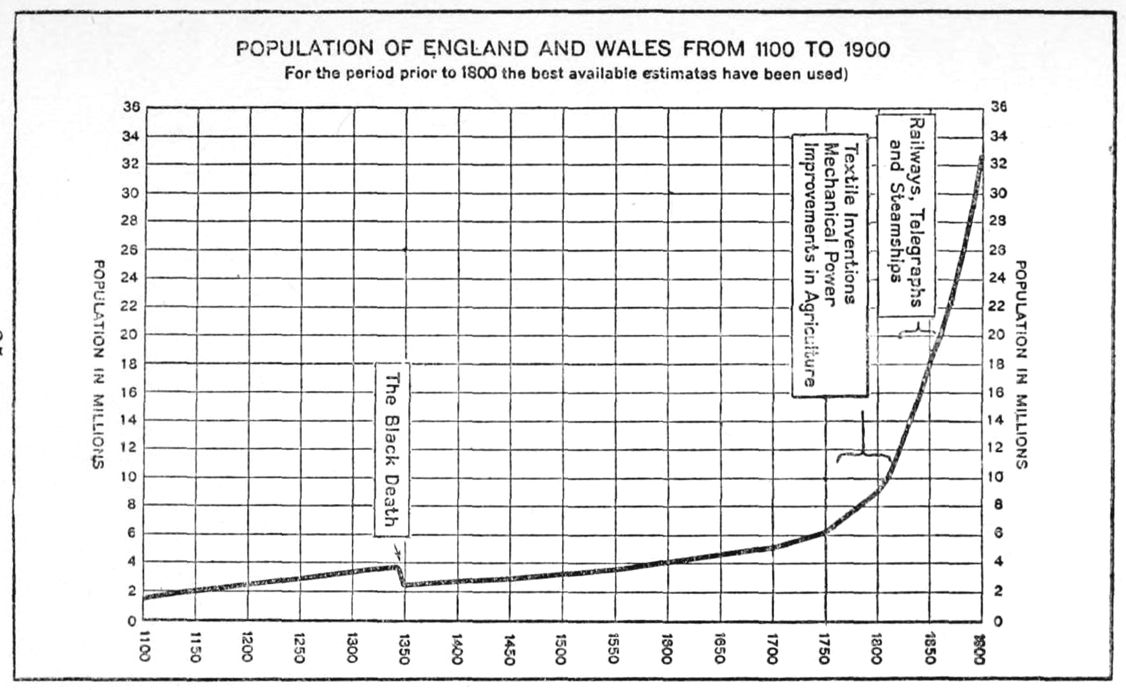
Population of England and Wales From 1100 to 1900, 1922

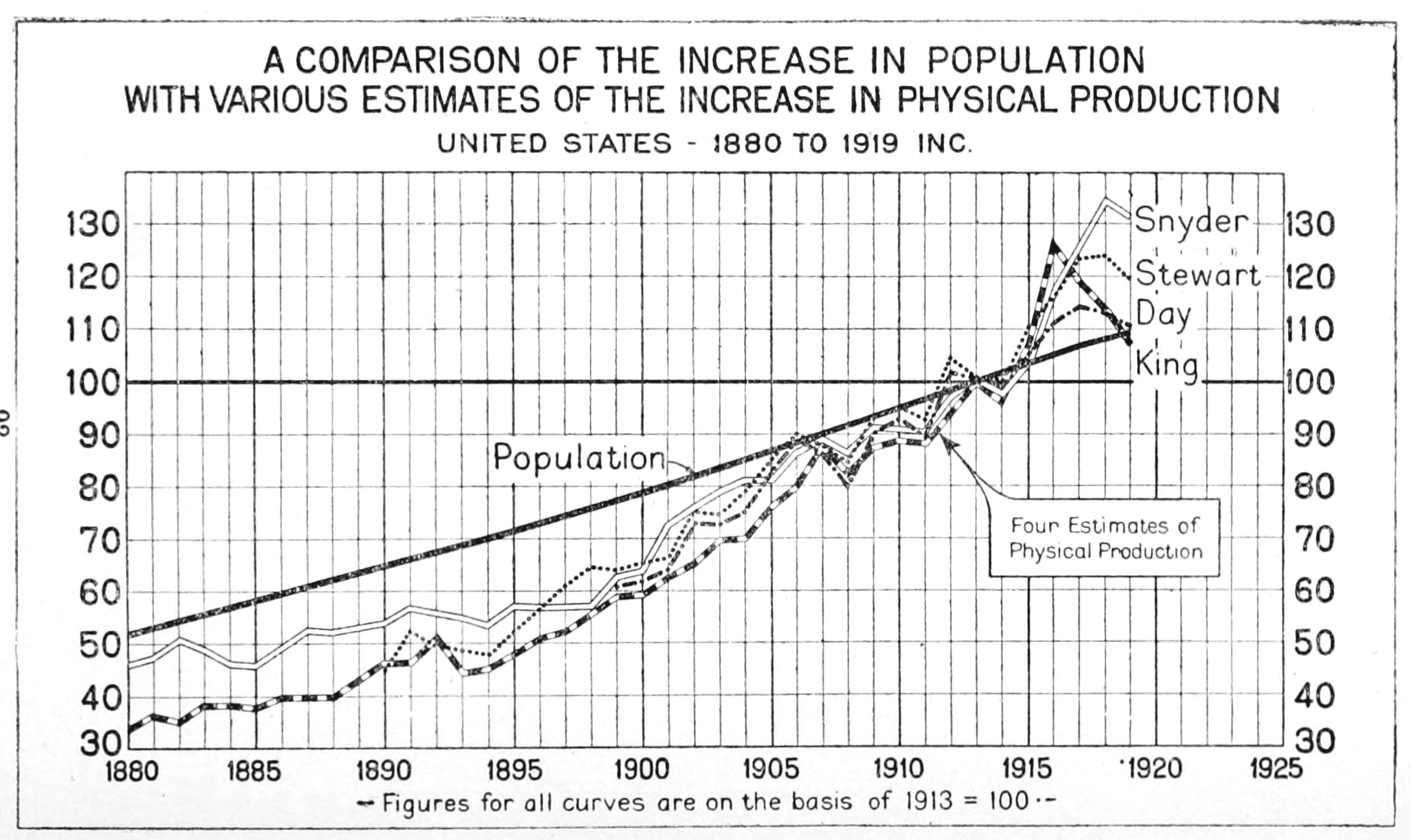
A Comparison of the Increase in Population and Physical Production in the US 1880–1919, 1922

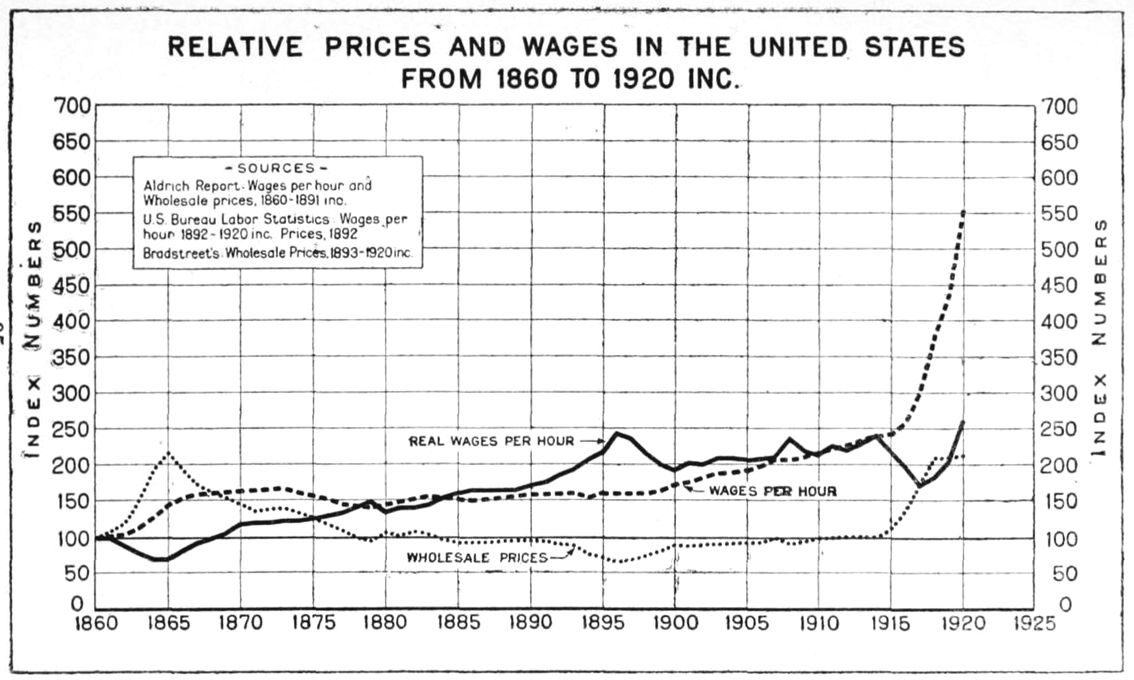
Relative Prices and Wages in the US from 1860 to 1920 Inc, 1922

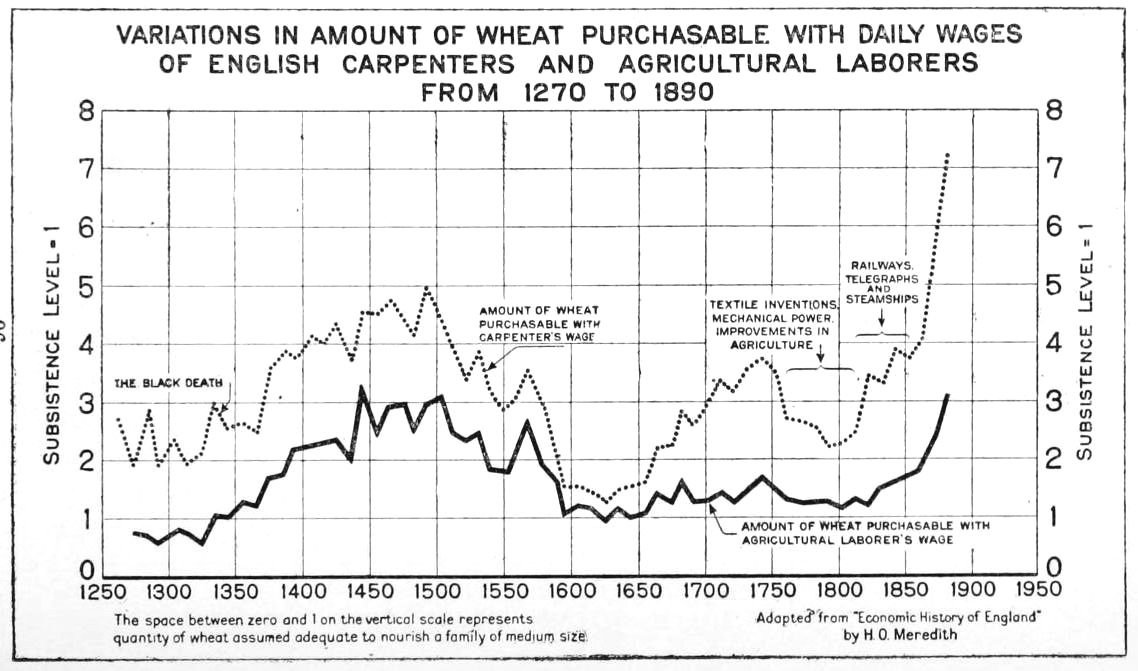
Variation in Amount of Wheat Purchasable with Daily Wages from 1270 to 1890, 1922

When John Randolph Riggleman in 1926 presented his "Graphic Methods for Presenting Business Statistics," he acknowledged, that both Edmund Ezra Day and Rorty had assisted in the production of that volume. Rorty had written its introduction and had made significant improvements throughout the book.

=== Laissez-faire approach to business ===
In his works Rory defended a "laissez-faire approach to business." For example, in 1921 he stipulated:

It is not necessary to deprive capital of a due reward, or savings of their incentive, in order to assure a just recompense to labor. Rather may the labor of today gain by granting freely to the stored-up labor of yesterday, which is capital, that fraction of the increased output from new industrial processes and machinery which is necessary to stimulate savings and thereby promote business enterprise.

However Gross (2010) commented "Rorty was not an armchair ideologist. He considered it essential that business be run in accordance with the theories and findings of modern economics, and this required hard economic data: facts and figures about the present-day economy."

== Selected publications ==
- Rorty, Malcolm Churchill. Some Problems in Current Economics. AW Shaw Company, 1922.
- Scott Nearing, Sam Adolph Lewisohn, Malcolm Churchill Rorty, and Morris Hillquit. The Future of Capitalism and Socialism in America. New York: League for Industrial Democracy, 1927.
- Counts, G. S., Villari, L., Rorty, M. C., & Baker, N. D. (1932). Bolshevism, Fascism, and Capitalism: An Account of the Three Economic Systems. Institute of politics.
- Rorty, Malcolm Churchill. Corporate Financial Policies from Boom to Depression. American Management Association, 1932.
- Rorty, Malcolm Churchill. A Background for Labor Relations. American Management Association, 1934.

Articles, a selection:

- Rorty, Malcolm C. "The statistical control of business activities." Harvard Business Review 1 (1923): 154–66.
