= Harris Mowbray =

Braille-related Linguist

- Born: October 3, 1999 (age 26); New York City, U.S.
- Education: American University
- Occupation: Computational linguist
- Known for: Work on Braille for world languages

Harris Mowbray (/ˈhæ.ɹɪs ˈmoʊ.breɪ/; born October 3, 1999) is an amateur linguist and programmer from the United States. He is notable for creating several proposals to encode minority languages around the world in Braille.

== Early life ==
Harris was born in New York City to Michele Madansky, a marketing research consultant who, at the time, served as an executive at Yahoo and Travis Mowbray, a clinical trials manager. He was raised in the Silicon Valley. His maternal grandfather was statistician Albert Madansky. He is of Ashkenazi Jewish descent.

== Braille ==
Harris began by making Braille for the Gagauz language and the Sorbian language. He was widely featured in Polish press for his Kashubian Braille proposal. His Braille alphabets' proposals have been accepted for the Livonian language, Fulani language, and Lakota language. He also created a manual alphabet (sign language alphabet) for the Fulani language, based on the Adlam script. In March 2021, Harris Mowbray prepared a Braille proposal for two official languages of the US Northern Mariana Islands, Chamorro and Carolinian In mid-2021, the Udi community of Azerbaijan accepted his proposal for Braille in their language. Mowbray also helped digitize Georgian Braille.

In late 2021, Harris developed Braille for the First Nations language Smalgyax spoken in northern British Columbia, the Elfdalian language, and the Rusyn language.

By early 2022, Harris had collaborated with the World Uyghur Congress to create braille for the Uyghur language with the support of other researchers. He also worked with the Khoekhoegowab speaking community of Namibia to develop Braille for their language's orthography.

Harris successfully worked with the Samogitian speaking community of Lithuania in order to create a braille standard for their language in late 2022. In 2023 he worked with Crimean Tatars in Ukraine to develop Braille for their Latin alphabet.

== Personal life ==
Harris attended The American University in Washington, D.C.
