= Hal S. Stern =

American statistician

- Title: Provost and Executive Vice Chancellor

Academic background
- Education: Stanford University; MIT

Academic work
- Discipline: Statistics; Forensic Evidence
- Institutions: University of California, Irvine

Hal Stern is an American statistician, with a focus on Bayesian statistics and is one of the authors of the textbook Bayesian Data Analysis.

Stern has developed several statistical methods in forensic science. He also participates in the Forensic Science Advisory Committee of the American Statistical Association. He is a part of the leadership team of the Center for Statistics and Applications in Forensic Evidence (CSAFE).

He is the Provost and Executive Vice Chancellor at the University of California, Irvine (UCI) and Chancellor's Professor in the Department of Statistics.

Stern is a fellow of the American Statistical Association, American Association for the Advancement of Science, Institute of Mathematical Statistics, and International Society for Bayesian Analysis. In 2022, Stern received the American Statistical Association Founders Award.
