= Jane Pendergast =

American biostatistician

Jane Pendergast is an American biostatistician specializing in multivariate statistics and longitudinal data. She is a professor in the Department of Biostatistics & Bioinformatics at Duke University.

== Education and career ==
Pendergast majored in mathematics at the University of Dayton, graduating in 1974, and went to the University of Iowa for graduate study, earning a master's degree in 1976 and completing her Ph.D. in 1979. Her dissertation was Robust Estimation in Growth Curve Models.

After working as research faculty at the University of Florida beginning in 1980, she moved to the University of Iowa as an associate professor in 1999, and was promoted to full professor there in 2005. She moved to her incumbent position at Duke University in 2015.

She was regional president for the Eastern North American Region of the International Biometric Society in 2006, and chair of the Committee of Presidents of Statistical Societies for 2013–2015.

== Recognition ==
Pendergast was named a Fellow of the American Statistical Association in 1998, and a Fellow of the American Association for the Advancement of Science in 2016 "for advancing statistics within public health and for her skilled, creative and dedicated service to the profession, including effectively advocating for improved recognition of AAAS Sections".

She was a recipient of the American Statistical Association Founders Award in 2017, for her service to the association.
