= Barry D. Nussbaum =

American statistician

Barry D. Nussbaum is an American statistician. Nussbaum earned a bachelor's degree from Rensselaer Polytechnic Institute and a master's and doctorate from George Washington University.

Nussbaum joined the United States Environmental Protection Agency in 1975 and served as chief statistician from 2006 to 2016. Early in his career, Nussbaum helped lead a recall of 208,000 cars for excessive carbon monoxide emissions, based on a sample of just ten cars. He is a recipient of two EPA Silver Medals for Superior Service and the EPA's Distinguished Career Service Award.

Nussbaum was president of the American Statistical Association for 2017.

He has also taught graduate statistics courses for Virginia Tech and George Washington universities.

In 2024 Nussbaum was recipient of the American Statistical Association's Founders Award.
