= Mary Foulkes =

American biostatistician (1949–2025)

Mary Ann Foulkes (September 8, 1949 – February 8, 2025) was an American biostatistician who directed the Office of Biostatistics and Epidemiology in the US Food and Drug Administration.

== Life ==
Foulkes was born on September 8, 1949, in St. Joseph, Michigan, the eldest child in a family of six children. She graduated from a Catholic high school in St. Joseph in 1967. After undergraduate studies at Siena Heights College, a Catholic school in Adrian, Michigan, she went on for a master's degree in biostatistics from the University of Michigan, followed by a 1980 Ph.D. in biostatistics from the University of North Carolina at Chapel Hill. Her doctoral dissertation, An index of tracking for longitudinal data, was supervised by Clarence E. Davis.

From 1980 to 1984, she worked at the MD Anderson Cancer Center, where she assisted Edmund Gehan on clinical trials. She joined the National Institute of Neurological Disorders and Stroke in the National Institutes of Health (NIH) in 1985. Within the NIH, she moved to the Division of AIDS in the National Institute of Allergy and Infectious Diseases, where she became branch chief for biostatistics. Then, at the Food and Drug Administration, she became deputy director and then director for the Office of Biostatistics and Epidemiology in the Center for Biologics Evaluation and Research.

Next, she became a research professor in the Department of Epidemiology in George Washington University's Milken Institute School of Public Health. After retiring in 2019, she moved to Traverse City, Michigan in 2021, and died there on February 8, 2025.

== Recognition ==
Foulkes was elected as a Fellow of the American Statistical Association in 1995, and as a Fellow of the American Association for the Advancement of Science in 2007.

She was one of four 1995 recipients of the American Statistical Association Founders Award for distinguished service to the association.
