= Claire McKay Bowen =

American statistician

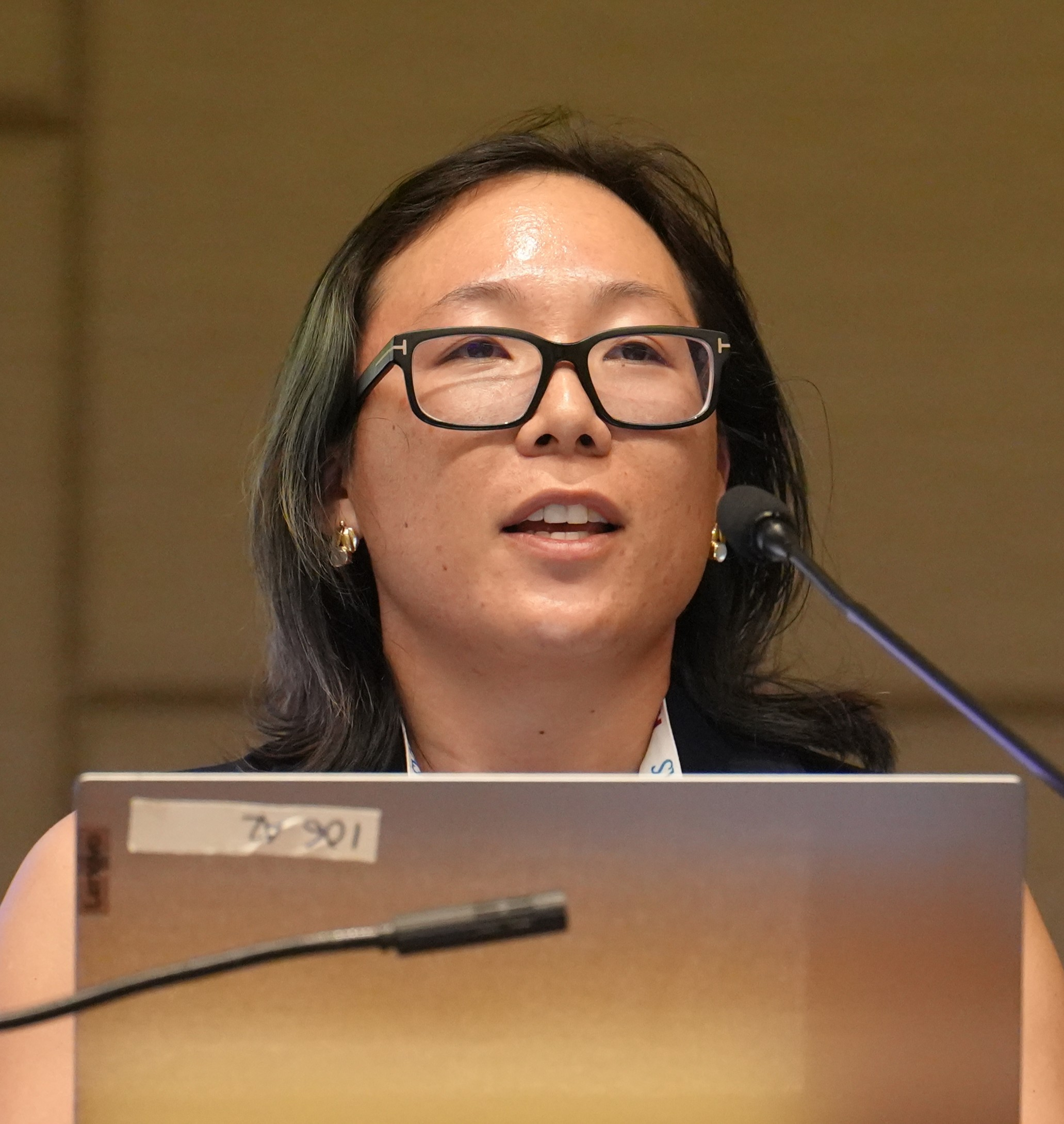
- Bowen in 2026
- Education: Idaho State University; University of Notre Dame
- Scientific career
- Fields: Statistics

Claire McKay Bowen is an American statistician whose work focuses on data privacy, differential privacy, synthetic data, and their effects on the statistical analysis of economic data. She is a senior fellow and head of the statistical methods group in the Center on Labor, Human Services, and Population of the Urban Institute, an American think tank.

== Education and career ==
Bowen grew up on a farm in Idaho. After graduating from Salmon High School in Idaho, she majored in mathematics and physics, with a minor in statistics, at Idaho State University, earning a bachelor's degree there in 2012. She became part of the first generation in her family to earn a college degree.

She continued her studies in applied and computational mathematics and statistics at the University of Notre Dame. After a master's degree in 2015, she completed her Ph.D. in 2018. Her dissertation, Data Privacy via Integration of Differential Privacy and Data Synthesis, was supervised by Fang Liu.

She joined the Urban Institute in 2019, after a year of postdoctoral research at the Los Alamos National Laboratory, working with Joanne Wendelberger and Earl Lawrence.

== Book ==
Bowen is the author of Protecting Your Privacy in a Data-Driven World (CRC Press, 2021).

== Recognition ==
In 2021, Bowen was named to the Leadership Academy of the Committee of Presidents of Statistical Societies, "for contributions to the development and broad dissemination of Statistics and Data Science methods and concepts, particularly in the emerging field of Data Privacy, and for leadership of technical initiatives, professional development activities, and educational programs". She was elected as a Fellow of the American Statistical Association in 2024.
