= Gladys H. Reynolds =

American statistician

Gladys H. Reynolds is an American statistician who did pioneering research on modeling sexually transmitted diseases. She worked for many years at the Centers for Disease Control and Prevention (CDC), was the first female chief of a CDC statistics branch, and the first statistician to serve in that role.

== Education and career ==
Reynolds did her undergraduate studies at Yankton College and was encouraged by the head of the mathematics department there to go on to graduate study. She earned a master's degree in statistics at Virginia Tech, and joined the CDC in 1960. Five years later, she moved to Emory University as an instructor, and completed a Ph.D. there in 1973. Her dissertation, A Control Model for Gonorrhea, was one of the first works to produce a mathematical model for the sexual transmission of disease. She returned to CDC, where she headed the Evaluation and Statistical Services Branch of the Division of Sexually Transmitted Diseases from 1979 to 1989, and worked in the Office of Minority Health as a senior statistician from 1989 to 2007, when she retired. She also chaired the Statistics in Epidemiology section of the American Statistical Association.

== Activism ==
As well as working on disease modeling, Reynolds worked for equality at CDC. She recalls that, when she started at CDC, there were no African-Americans there, very few women, and significant resistance to change in those areas, and that she was "very much involved in trying to hire women and minorities". She served on the Equal Employment Opportunity Advisory Council from 1986 to 1987, chairing the Affirmative Action Committee in 1987, and serving as president of the Association of Executive Women of the CDC. In this work, she used her statistical expertise to set hiring goals that would achieve a representative workforce. In her work for the American Statistical Association, she also campaigned for greater representation of women and minorities in association offices and honors, and from 1996 to 2002 she chaired the association's Committee on Minorities. She also belonged to the Minority Affairs Committee of the American College of Epidemiology.

== Awards and honors ==
Reynolds was elected as a fellow of the American College of Epidemiology in 1983, and of the American Statistical Association in 1985. She was elected to the International Statistical Institute in 1986. The CDC gave Reynolds their Award for Contributions to the Advancement of Women in 1986, and Women in Science and Engineering gave her their Lifetime Achievement Award in 1989. In 1999 Reynolds was recipient of the American Statistical Association's Founders Award.
