= Linda Gage =

American demographer

Linda H. Gage
- Education: University of California, Davis
- Scientific career
- Fields: Statistics
- Workplaces: California Department of Finance

Linda H. Gage is an American demographer. She is the former state demographer of California, and chief of the Demographic Research Unit of the California Department of Finance, where she worked since 1975. As of 2012, she was retired.

== Early life ==
Gage earned a master's degree in sociology from the University of California, Davis in 1974, specializing in demography. She belongs to the advisory board of the program in demographic and social analysis at the University of California, Irvine.

== Career ==
She served the Population Association of America as chair of its Committee on Population Statistics and in 1997, its Committee on Applied Demography, and also chaired the American Statistical Association Section on Government Statistics in 1997. She won the American Statistical Association Founders Award in 2005, and was elected as a Fellow of the American Statistical Association in 2007.
