= Maura Stokes =

American statistician and novelist

Maura Ellen Stokes is an American statistician and novelist. She is a senior director of research and development for the SAS Institute, the co-author of the statistics book Categorical Data Analysis using SAS, and a Fellow of the American Statistical Association. She is also the author of the early-teen novel Fadeaway, published by Simon & Schuster in 2018.

== Education and statistical career ==
Stokes earned a bachelor's degree, master's degree, and Ph.D. in biostatistics from the University of North Carolina in 1978, 1979, and 1986 respectively. She also has an MFA in writing from the Vermont College of Fine Arts.

After working for the Center for Survey Statistics in North Carolina from 1982 to 1985, she has been affiliated with the SAS Institute since 1986, and has held an adjunct faculty position at the University of North Carolina since 1987.

== Books ==
Stokes is the author of:

- Categorical Data Analysis Using the SAS system (with Charles S. Davis and Gary G. Koch, 1995; 2nd ed., 2000; 3rd ed., Categorical Data Analysis Using SAS, 2012)
- Fadeaway (2018)

== Recognition ==
Stokes was elected as a Fellow of the American Statistical Association in 2008. In 2016, she won the American Statistical Association Founders Award for distinguished service to the organization, "for sustained, thoughtful contributions to the expansion of professional development opportunities for practicing statisticians; for outstanding leadership in the development of the Applied Conference on Statistical Practice, which extends the reach of the ASA to nonstatisticians as well as statisticians; for commitment to enhancing the relevance of the ASA to applied statisticians as evidenced by her leadership in the creation of the ASA's Professional Development Guidelines; for insightful teaching of LearnStat and JSM short courses; and for continued mentoring at the local and national levels".
