= Carl Snyder =

American economist and statistician

Carl Snyder (April 23, 1869, Cedar Falls IA – 1946 Santa Barbara CA) was an American economist and statistician.

Although he attended the University of Iowa and studied in Paris, he was chiefly self-taught. He began as a journalist; at the age of 20, he was editor of the Council Bluffs Nonparell, later writing editorials for The Washington Post. Snyder was also something of a science writer, authoring popular articles in magazines such as McClure's and the Fortnightly Review about, for example, Jacques Loeb's experiments on the nature of living tissue. He was a president of the American Statistical Association, a Fellow of the American Association for Advancement of Science and of the American Academy of Arts and Letters, and a member of the Institut Internationale de Statistique.

In the 1910s and 20s, Snyder was employed as a statistician in the research department of the Federal Reserve Bank of New York, under Benjamin Strong. The two men clashed, but still respected each other. During these years, he lectured at American universities and contributed to economic and statistical journals.

Snyder's response to the Great Depression was to write his magnum opus Capitalism the Creator (1940). The book, written in an eccentric prose style replete with fragmentary sentences, is part classical liberal manifesto, part elucubration of an enthusiastic statistical autodidact. It blamed the Depression on the Fed's failure to stabilize the money stock and the price level. The book provided inspiration to such figures as Ayn Rand and Friedrich von Hayek.

== Works ==
- Carl Snyder: Capitalism the Creator. The Economic Foundations of Modern Industrial Society. Macmillan, New York 1940 (PDF).
- Snyder, Carl (1934). "The Increase of Long-Term Debt in the United States (from 1880)". Journal of the American Statistical Association. 29 (186): 166–74. doi:10.1080/01621459.1934.10502702. JSTOR 2278286.
- Snyder, Carl (1930). "Brokers' Loans and the Pyramiding of Credit". Journal of the American Statistical Association. 25 (169): 88–92. doi:10.2307/2277205. JSTOR 2277205.
- "Carl Snyder". JSTOR.

== Bibliography ==
- Garvy George (1978). "Carl Snyder, Pioneer Economic Statistician and Monetarist". History of Political Economy. 10 (3): 454–90. doi:10.1215/00182702-10-3-454.
