= Bonnie Ray =

American data scientist

Bonnie Kathryn Ray is an American statistician and data scientist, the head of data science at Chartbeat, a publisher data analytics firm. Her publications in statistics have concerned long-range dependence, change detection, orthogonal defect classification, and wide-ranging applications including analysis of business models, climate models, and software engineering.

== Education and career ==
Ray is originally from Mississippi, and grew up in northern Louisiana. She majored in mathematics at Baylor University, where she was president of the Mu Sigma Beta mathematics honor society, and held summer internships at Texas Instruments. She graduated Phi Beta Kappa in 1985, and completed a Ph.D. in statistics at Columbia University in 1991. Her dissertation, Fractionally Differenced ARMA Processes: Seasonality and Forecasting Issues, was jointly supervised by Jonathan Hosking and Howard Levene.

After postdoctoral research with Peter Lewis at the Naval Postgraduate School, she became an assistant professor of mathematics at the New Jersey Institute of Technology, and earned tenure there before moving to the Thomas J. Watson Research Center of IBM Research in 2001. At IBM she spent two years as program manager for analytics and optimization at IBM's China Research Laboratory in Beijing, and eventually became senior manager for data and decision analytics and director of cognitive algorithms.

In 2015, Ray moved from IBM to become vice president of data science at Talkspace, an online and mobile therapy company, before moving again to her present position at Chartbeat.

== Recognition ==
Ray was elected as a Fellow of the American Statistical Association in 2005.
