= Theresa Utlaut =

American statistician

Theresa Lynn (Teri) Utlaut is an American statistician, and a principal engineer at Intel Corporation, where she develops statistical methods for Intel's microprocessor and integrated circuit manufacturing processes, as well as providing statistical consultation and training. She is also a user of the JMP statistical software package and its scripting language, and a coauthor of the book JSL Companion: Applications of the JMP® Scripting Language.

== Education and career ==
Utlaut was an undergraduate at the University of Portland. She completed a Ph.D. in statistics at Oregon State University in 1999, with the dissertation F-Tests in Partially Balanced and Unbalanced Mixed Linear Models supervised by David S. Birkes.

While a student, she worked at Intel as a summer intern for three summers, and she joined Intel permanently after completing her Ph.D.

== Service ==
Utlaut chaired the Quality and Productivity Section of the American Statistical Association (ASA) in 2013. She was elected as chair of the ASA Council of Sections Governing Board in 2016, and in the same year chaired the Statistics Division of the American Society for Quality. In 2021-2022 she chaired the ASA Committee on Membership Retention and Recruitment.

== Recognition ==
Utlaut was named a Fellow of the American Society for Quality in 2020, "for outstanding leadership and accomplishments in implementing quality and process improvement projects; for extraordinary commitment to the development and teaching of courses; for exceptional dedication while mentoring others; and for the passionate promotion of quality and statistics". In 2022 she was named as a Fellow of the American Statistical Association. She was one of five 2023 recipients of the American Statistical Association Founders Award for distinguished service to the association.
