= Lester Frankel =

Lester Robert Frankel (1913 – February 11, 2006) was a prominent American survey statistician. He studied under Harold Hotelling, receiving a master's degree from Columbia University in 1936, and in 1953 he was elected as a Fellow of the American Statistical Association. He served as the 70th president of the American Statistical Association in 1975. He was also president of the Market Research Council, and received awards for distinguished service from that organization and the American Association for Public Opinion Research.

Frankel helped develop one of the first unemployment measures and conduct one of the first federal surveys of unemployment (1940). After this was taken over by the U.S. Census Bureau, it became known as the Current Population Survey. Frankel served in the navy from 1944 to 1946. He later worked for Dun & Bradstreet, Alfred Politz Research, and Audits & Surveys Worldwide.

He died after a stroke at the age of 92.
