= Ji-Hyun Lee (statistician) =

American statistician

Ji-Hyun Lee is an American statistician whose research involves clinical trials, especially for the treatment of cancer.

Lee did her graduate studies in biostatistics at the University of North Carolina at Chapel Hill, where she earned a master's degree in 2000 and completed her doctorate in 2003. She joined the faculty at the University of South Florida in 2003, and in 2014 moved to the University of New Mexico as a professor of internal medicine and director of biostatistics in the UNM Comprehensive Cancer Center. Since 2018 she has been a professor of biostatistics at the University of Florida and director of biostatistics and quantitative sciences in the University of Florida Health Cancer Center.

Lee was president of the Caucus for Women in Statistics for the 2017 term, and in 2018 was elected as a Fellow of the American Statistical Association. She was elected as the 120th President of the American Statistical Association who serves in the year of 2025.
