= Jeri Mulrow =

American statistician

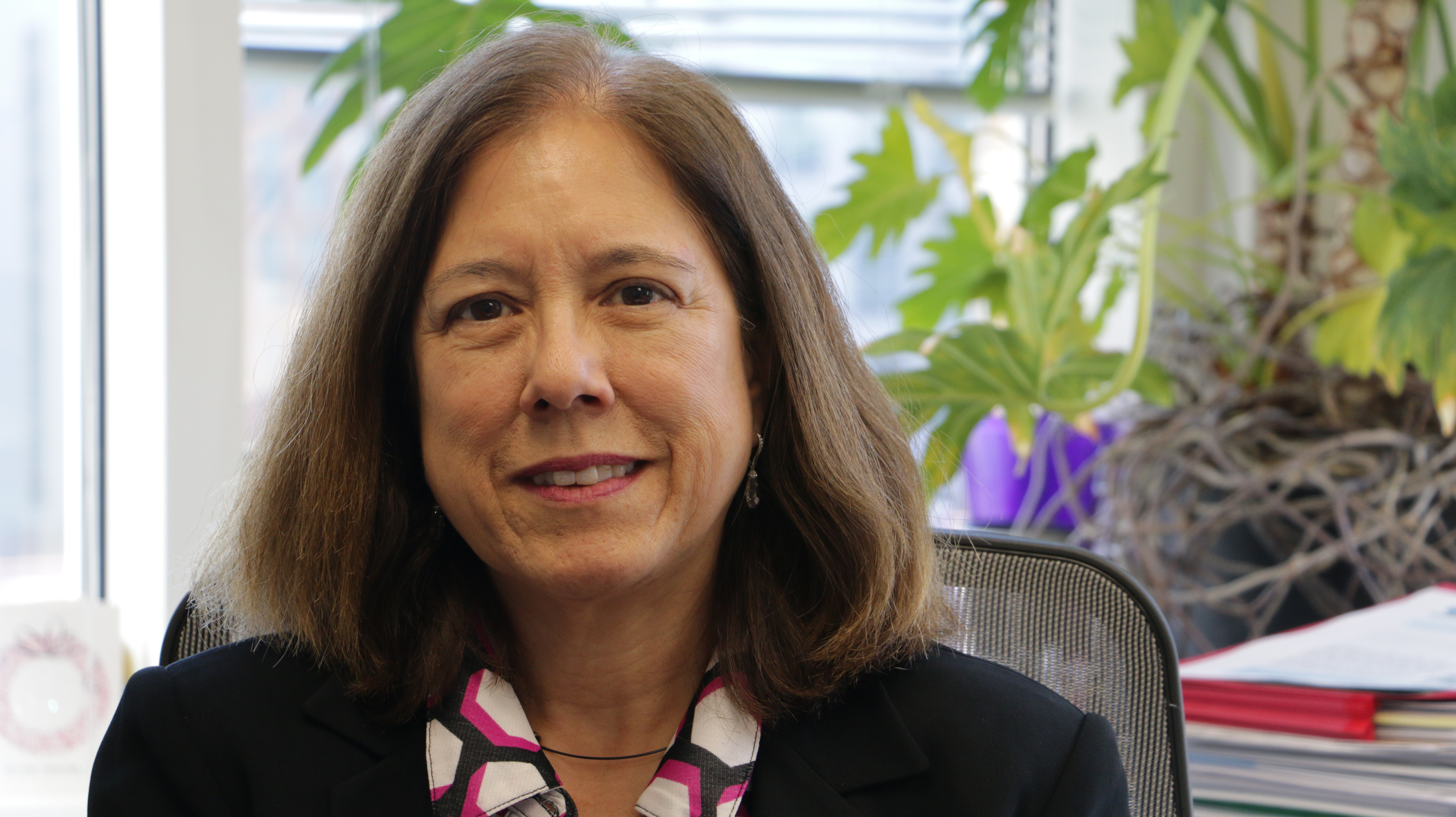
Mulrow in 2015

Jeri Metzger Mulrow is an American statistician, the 2026 president of the American Statistical Association. Formerly a government statistician and deputy director at the US Bureau of Justice Statistics, she works as a vice president at Westat, a company that provides data collection and analysis services to the US government and businesses.

== Education and career ==
Mulrow was born in Denver, Colorado, the daughter of John K. Metzger and Connie Setoo; she grew up in Helena, Montana, where her mother moved with her second husband, Norman E. Waterman. Although she had loved mathematics in school, she entered Montana State University intending to major in chemical engineering, but quickly switched to mathematics. After a 1982 bachelor's degree, she received a master's degree in statistics from Colorado State University.

She spent the bulk of her career in service to the US government, in the National Institute for Standards and Technology, Internal Revenue Service, National Center for Science and Engineering Statistics, and the Department of Justice, where she became Principal Deputy Director at the Bureau of Justice Statistics in 2016. Outside the government, she also worked at Southern Illinois University, NORC at the University of Chicago, and Ernst & Young. After she retired from the government, she became a vice president at Westat.

She was elected as president of the American Statistical Association in 2024, for a one-year term beginning in January 2026.

== Recognition ==
Mulrow was elected as a Fellow of the American Statistical Association in 2010. She was one of three 2013 recipients of the American Statistical Association Founders Award for distinguished service to the association.
