= Vicki Hertzberg =

American biostatistician

Vicki Stover Hertzberg is an American biostatistician, who is currently professor in the Nell Hodgson Woodruff School of Nursing of Emory University, where she founded and continues to direct its Center for Data Science. Previously she worked as a professor of biostatistics and bioinformatics in the Rollins School of Public Health of Emory University between 1994 and 2015, serving as the department chair 1994-2001.

== Education and career ==
Hertzberg studied mathematics and statistics at Miami University of Ohio, graduating in 1976. She completed a PhD in biomathematics and health statistics in 1980 at the University of Washington. Her dissertation, Inter-Viewer Variability in Assessing Coronary Arteriography: A Statistical Model, was supervised by Lloyd Fisher. Next, she joined the faculty at the University of Cincinnati, where she remained until her 1995 move to Emory. At Emory, she chaired the Department of Biostatistics and Bioinformatics from 1994 to 2001.

== Awards and honors ==
Hertzberg won American Statistical Association Founders Award in 1994. She has been a fellow of the American Statistical Association since 1999,. She was one of the first American Statistical Association members to gain the P.Stat. certification designation.
