= Kate Calder =

American statistician and data scientist

Catherine A. "Kate" Calder is an American statistician who works as senior vice provost for academic administration and planning at the University of Texas at Austin. She was previously chair of the Department of Statistics and Data Science and a professor of statistics at Ohio State University. Calder earned a bachelor's degree in mathematics from Northwestern University in 1999, and completed her Ph.D. in statistics from Duke University in 2003 under the joint supervision of David Higdon and Michael L. Lavine. She joined the Ohio State faculty in 2003, and was promoted to full professor in 2015.

In 2013 she won the Young Investigator Award of the American Statistical Association (ASA), and in 2014 she was elected as a Fellow of the ASA "for outstanding contributions to the development of Bayesian statistical methodology for spatial and spatiotemporal data; for significant multidisciplinary collaborations; for excellence in teaching and mentoring graduate students both in statistics and in other disciplines; and for service to the profession." She was elected to the 2022 class of Fellows of the American Association for the Advancement of Science (AAAS). In 2025 Calder was recipient of the American Statistical Association's Founders Award.
