= June Morita =

American statistician and statistics educator

June Gloria Morita is an American statistician and statistics educator. She is a principal lecturer emerita in statistics at the University of Washington, and is known for her innovative lessons in statistics based on examples from real life. For instance, one of her classes tested whether helium-filled footballs travel farther than air-filled footballs, with the assistance of her son, Washington Huskies football place-kicker Eric Guttorp. Another lesson, for local elementary school students, tested the mark and recapture method by catching fish at the school's fish pond.

Morita did her undergraduate and graduate education at the University of California, Berkeley. She graduated in 1976 with a double major in mathematics and anthropology, earned a master's degree in 1978, and completed her Ph.D. in 1984. Her dissertation, supervised by Kjell Doksum, was Nonparametric Methods for Matched Observations from Life Distributions. Morita is married to Swedish statistician Peter Guttorp, who was also educated at Berkeley, and the two statisticians were the first new hires when the University of Washington first formed its statistics department in 1980.

Morita won Washington's Distinguished Teaching Award in 1999. In 2006, five years after her husband, she was elected as a Fellow of the American Statistical Association. She is also an elected member of the International Statistical Institute. In 2009, the American Statistical Association gave Morita their Founders Award "for outstanding leadership; for energetic service to the association as chapter president, regional vice chair, and chair of the Council of Chapters and a member of the Council of Sections Governing Board, the Board of Directors, and numerous committees; for initiating, promoting, and sustaining effective programs to enhance quantitative and statistical literacy in schools nationally and internationally, including Making Sense of Statistical Studies and programs to prepare undergraduates as mathematics/statistics tutors in middle schools; and for setting a standard of fun and excitement to the Council of Chapters activities at association meetings."
