= Frederick Ludwig Hoffman =

German-American statistician

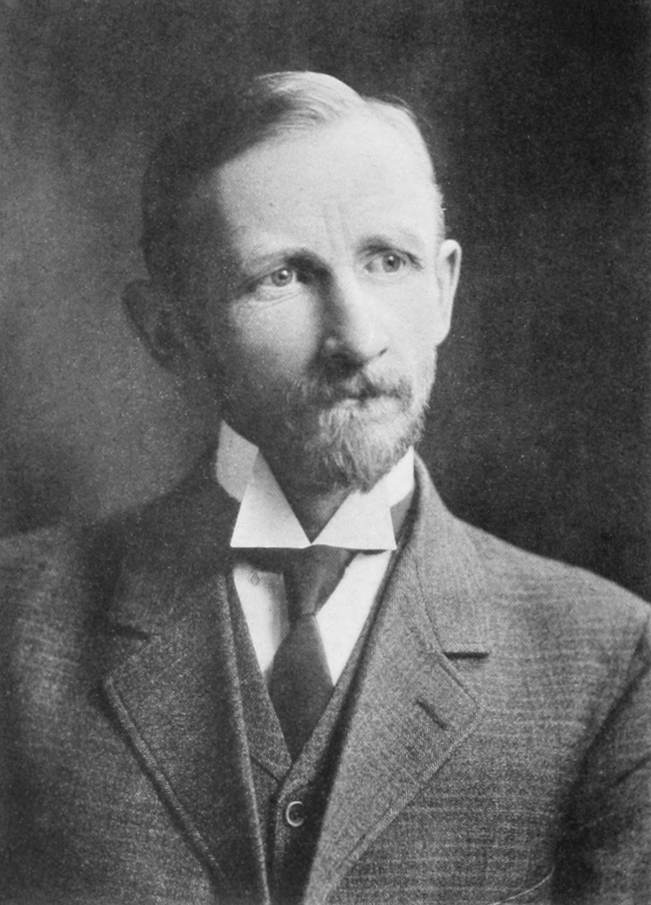
- Born: May 2, 1865; Varel, Grand Duchy of Oldenburg
- Died: February 23, 1946 (aged 80); San Diego, California, United States
- Burial place: Greenwood Memorial Park
- Occupation: Statistician
- Spouse: Ella G. Hay (m. 1891)
- Children: 7

Signature
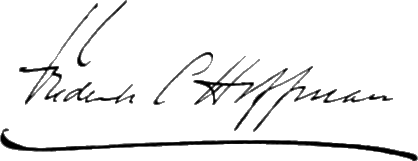

Frederick Ludwig Hoffman (May 2, 1865 – February 23, 1946) was an American statistician known for his work on health and demographic statistics. He is also notable for his promotion of scientific racism, and is a vocal opponent of government backed health insurance and social welfare.

== Biography ==
Hoffman was born Friedrich Ludwig Hoffmann in Varel in the Grand Duchy of Oldenburg on May 2, 1865 the son of the merchant Augustus Franziskus Hoffmann and his wife Antonette. His father died when Frederick was 11 years old. He was educated in the common and private schools in Germany. His school days, marked by failures, ended in 1880 without a degree. At the request of his single mother, who was now living in difficult financial circumstances, Frederick began a four-year commercial apprenticeship with various merchants in north-west Germany. The apprenticeship ended in 1884 also without a degree. Since Frederick saw no further professional and personal future for himself in Germany, he emigrated to the United States at the end of 1884. He became statistician for the Prudential Insurance Company of America in 1891. Hoffman was a racist against African Americans in his studies of incarceration. He was employed as statistician by many organizations and did research in ethnology and kindred subjects. He also served as President of the American Statistical Association in 1911.

Hoffman's first book, The Race Traits and Tendencies of the American Negro (1896), characterized African Americans as exceptionally disease-prone. The work was motivated by a concern about issues of race, and also the need of insurance companies to justify the higher life insurance premiums charged to African Americans. An 1897 critique of this work by Kelly Miller in occasional papers of the American Negro Academy of Washington, D.C., pointed out sampling problems with the 1890 census, which was the statistical basis of the work, and that there were insufficient adjustments for environmental factors. Hoffman found, contrary to common rhetoric at the time, that the population of African Americans was not increasing at a substantially more rapid pace than the White population. He found that while African Americans had a higher birth rate, they had an even higher mortality rate, which meant that the population of Whites increased at a higher pace than African Americans.

He married Ella G. Hay on July 15, 1891, and they had seven children.

He died in San Diego, California on February 23, 1946. He was buried at Greenwood Memorial Park.

A collection of his papers are held at the National Library of Medicine.

== Works ==
- The Race Traits and Tendencies of the American Negro (1896)
- Fatal Accidents in Coal Mining (1910)
- Mortality from Cancer Throughout the World (1915)
- Mortality from Respiratory Diseases in Dusty Trades (1917)

== Sources ==
- Reynolds, Francis J., ed. (1921). "Hoffman, Frederick Ludwig" . Collier's New Encyclopedia. New York: P. F. Collier & Son Company.
