= Christine A. Franklin =

American statistics educator

Christine on paddleboarding trip.

Christine Annette Franklin is an American statistics educator. She is senior lecturer emeritus and former Lothar Tresp Honoratus Honors Professor in the Department of Statistics at the University of Georgia, and the "ASA K–12 Statistical Ambassador Emeritus" of the American Statistical Association.

== Education and career ==
After becoming high school valedictorian in Forest City, North Carolina, Franklin majored in political science and mathematics at the University of North Carolina at Greensboro, graduating summa cum laude in 1978 and earning a master's degree in mathematics and statistics in 1980.

She worked as a mathematics instructor at the University of North Carolina at Greensboro from 1980 to 1982, and at the West Virginia University Institute of Technology from 1982 to 1986. She became a lecturer in statistics at the University of Florida from 1986 to 1989, when she moved to the University of Georgia. She was promoted to senior lecturer and Lothar Tresp Honoratus Honors Professor in 2008, and after a year in New Zealand as a Fulbright Scholar in 2015, she retired as senior lecturer emeritus in 2016.

Franklin was central to the development of AP Statistics, from 1997 until 2009 when she retired as the chief reader of the exam, and continuing in a consulting role afterwards. After previous leadership in developing standards for secondary education in statistics in Georgia and the US, she was named as the inaugural ASA K–12 Statistical Ambassador by the American Statistical Association in 2016, a role in which she provides professional development and national leadership for statistics education.

== Books ==
Franklin is an author of statistics textbooks including:

- Statistics: The Art and Science of Learning from Data (with Alan Agresti)
- Statistical Reasoning in Sports (with Josh Tabor)
- Statistics and Data Science for Teachers (with Anna Bargagliotti)

== Recognition ==
Franklin was elected as a Fellow of the American Statistical Association in 2004, and as an Elected Member of the International Statistical Institute in 2018.

She was the 2013 recipient of the Lifetime Achievement Award of the United States Conference on Teaching Statistics (USCOTS), now the Consortium for the Advancement of Undergraduate Statistics Education. She was a 2014 recipient of the American Statistical Association Founders Award, given for "her outstanding leadership and efforts in curricular development and teaching statistics; for her research, leadership and professional service in helping to grow the field of statistics education; for chairing the ASA-sponsored strategic initiative titled the Guidelines for Assessment and Instruction in Statistics Education; and for chairing and participating in numerous committees devoted to statistics education". She was the 2017 recipient of the Gladys M. Thomason Distinguished Service Award of the Georgia Council of Teachers of Mathematics.
