= Fritz Scheuren =

American statistician

- Education: Tufts University; George Washington University
- Known for: Statistics
- Awards: Shiskin Award in Economic Statistics
- Scientific career
- Fields: Statistician
- Workplaces: National Opinion Research Center, Social Security Administration, Internal Revenue Service, Office of Economic Opportunity

Fritz J. Scheuren is an American statistician known for his work on human rights, record linkage, and administrative records. He was president of the American Statistical Association in 2011.

Scheuren is a vice president of the National Opinion Research Center.

== Career ==
Scheuren was a coauthor, with Thomas Herzog and William E. Winkler, of the 1997 book, Data Quality and Record Linkage Techniques (Springer, 1997). He co-edited the book Statistical Methods for Human Rights with David L. Banks and Jana Asher.

In 1998 Scheuren was recipient of the American Statistical Association's Founders Award.
