= Dalene Stangl =

American statistician

Dalene K. Stangl
- Born: October 4, 1956 (age 69); Iowa
- Known for: Founder of ASA Conference Celebrating Women in Statistics and Data Science
- Awards: Fellow of the American Statistical Association, American Statistical Associations Founder's Award
- Scientific career
- Fields: Statistics
- Thesis: Modeling Heterogeneity in Multi-center Clinical Trials Using Bayesian Hierarchical Models (1991)
- Doctoral advisor: Joel B. Greenhouse

Dalene Kay Stangl (born October 4, 1956) is an American statistician known for development and promotion of Bayesian statistical methods in health-related research.

== Education and career ==
Stangl grew up on a farm in Cass County, Iowa, and was the first in her family to attain a Ph.D. She graduated from Iowa State University in 1978 with a bachelor's degree in psychology and sociology, and earned a master's degree in 1980 from the University of Iowa. She later attended graduate school at Carnegie Mellon University, she earned a second master's degree in statistics in 1988 and a Ph.D. in 1991. Her dissertation was Modeling Heterogeneity in Multi-center Clinical Trials Using Bayesian Hierarchical Models.

Stangl worked for 25 years as a faculty member at Duke University, beginning in 1992 and eventually becoming Professor of the Practice of Statistics and Public Policy and director of the Institute of Statistics and Decision Science. In 2017 she moved back to Carnegie Mellon University where she is now emeritus.

== Contributions ==
With Don Berry, Stangl has edited books on Bayesian methods in biostatistics and on meta-analysis.

She chaired the Section on Bayesian Statistical Science (2006) and the Committee on Women in Statistics (2011–2016) of the American Statistical Association. She is a founder of the annual Women in Statistics and Data Science conference.

== Recognition ==
In 2002, Stangl was elected to be a Fellow of the American Statistical Association. In 2019, Stangl was presented with the American Statistical Association Founders Award.
