= Sally C. Morton =

American statistician

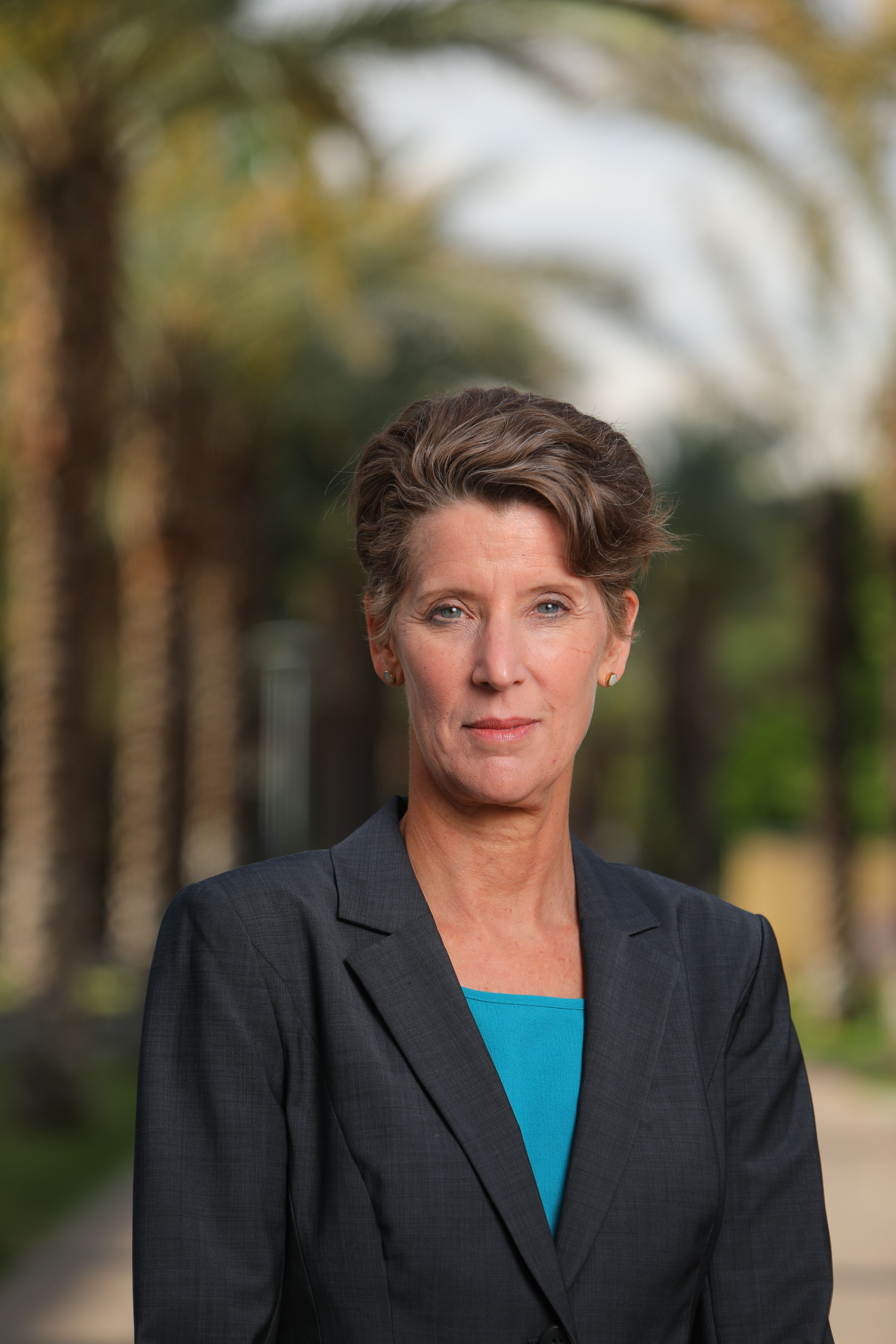
Sally C. Morton

Sally C. Morton is an American statistician specializing in comparative effectiveness research. In 2021, Morton joined Arizona State University as executive vice president of Knowledge Enterprise, the administrative subdivision of Arizona State involving university research. Morton is also a professor in the College of Health Solutions and the School of Mathematical Statistical Sciences and holds the Florence Ely Nelson Chair at Arizona State.

Morton was educated at Stanford University and the London School of Economics. Her PhD thesis, Interpretable Projection Pursuit, was completed at Stanford in 1990, under the tutelage of Jerome H. Friedman. Before joining ASU, Morton was dean of the College of Science and professor of statistics at Virginia Tech. Prior to this role, she worked at RTI International, the RAND Corporation and the University of Pittsburgh.

Morton was 2009 president of the American Statistical Association (ASA) and 2013 chair of Section U (Statistics) of the American Association for the Advancement of Science (AAAS). She is a fellow of the ASA and of the AAAS, and an elected member of the Society for Research Synthesis Methodology and the International Statistical Institute (ISI). She won the American Statistical Association Founders Award in 2015 and is the 2017 winner of the Janet L. Norwood Award. She was elected to the National Academy of Medicine in 2024.
