= Robert E. Chaddock =

President of the American Statistical Association

Robert Emmet Chaddock
- Born: April 16, 1879
- Died: October 21, 1940 (aged 61)
- Occupations: professor; sociologist; statistician

Academic background
- Education: College of Wooster; Columbia University

Academic work
- Institutions: University of Pennsylvania; Columbia University

Robert Emmet Chaddock (April 16, 1879 – October 21, 1940) was an American sociologist and statistician specializing in population and vital statistics. He taught at Columbia University for most of his career, and advised the U.S. Census Bureau, developing the concept of the census tract. He served as President of the American Statistical Association in 1925. Chaddock died by suicide at the age of 61.

== Early life and education ==
Chaddock was born to a farm family in Minerva, Ohio. He graduated from the College of Wooster in 1900 and remained there as a faculty member until 1905. Chaddock then enrolled as a graduate student at Columbia University, where he earned an MA in 1906 and a Ph.D. in 1908, under the direction of Franklin H. Giddings. During that same year, he worked with the boy's club of the Union Settlement in New York City, where he met his wife, Rose A. Fallbush (married 1910).

== Academic career ==
Chaddock taught economics at Columbia University from 1907 to 1909. He then taught for two years at the Wharton School of the University of Pennsylvania before returning to Columbia as an assistant professor of statistics in 1911. He was promoted to associate professor in 1912 and Professor in 1922. He chaired the department until shortly before his death.

Chaddock served as secretary-treasurer of the American Statistical Association from 1917 to 1924 and president in 1925. His presidential address was titled "The Function of Statistics in Undergraduate Training," in which he argued that social science students needed a foundation in statistics, comparable to introductory lab courses in the physical sciences.

Chaddock was also involved in the institutionalization of demography in the United States. He was a founding member of the International Union for the Scientific Investigation of Population Problems and the Population Association of America. He taught several prominent demographers at Columbia University, including Warren S. Thompson and T.J. Woofter.

Chaddock chaired the Census Advisory Committee and the Advisory Committee on Research for the Welfare Council in New York City. In his work on these committees he developed the concept of the census tract. He was vice-chair of the Committee on Research in Medical Economics, and a member of the advisory council of the Milbank Memorial Fund, the International Statistical Institute, the American Sociological Society, Phi Beta Kappa, and the Century Club (New York).

== Book ==
Chaddock published Principles and Methods of Statistics in 1925. It soon became one of the most popular books in the field. He was working on a revision of this book when he died in 1940.

== Death ==
Chaddock fell from the roof of his apartment building in New York on October 21, 1940, in what was believed to be a suicide. He had been "under a physician's care for a nervous condition" and "distraught...over his wife's long ill health," according to The New York Times.
