= Joanne Wendelberger =

American statistician

Joanne Roth Wendelberger is an American statistician and a scientist at the Los Alamos National Laboratory.

== Education and career ==
Wendelberger is a 1981 graduate of Oberlin College. She completed her Ph.D. in 1991 at the University of Wisconsin–Madison. Her dissertation, Impact, Identification and Estimation of Sources of Transmitted Variation (Propagated Error), was supervised by George E. P. Box, and her graduate work was also influenced by William Hunter and Brian Joiner.

She joined the Statistical Sciences Group at the Los Alamos National Laboratory in 1992, and became group leader in 2010. She was also deputy division leader for the Computational & Statistical Sciences Division in 2016.

== Recognition ==
Wendelberger was elected as a Fellow of the American Statistical Association in 2005.

She is the 2017 winner of the William G. Hunter Award of the Statistics Division of the American Society for Quality, recognizing her promotion of statistical thinking both in her work at the Los Alamos National Laboratory and in local community activism.
