= Bonnie Ghosh-Dastidar =

American statistician

Madhumita "Bonnie" Ghosh-Dastidar is an American statistician, originally from India. She works at the RAND Corporation as a senior statistician, data scientist, and head of the statistics group; she is also the former president of the American Statistical Association. Her work at RAND involves the application of statistical analysis to public policy decisionmaking, including population health and the effectiveness of environmental and behavioral interventions.

== Education and career ==
Ghosh-Dastidar grew up speaking the Bengali language in Kolkata. She majored in mathematics and computer science at Albright College in Pennsylvania, graduating in 1991 with the support of an Albright College Foreign Student Scholarship. After working in the pharmaceutical industry, she continued her studies in statistics at the Pennsylvania State University, receiving a master's degree in 1996 and completing her Ph.D. in 1999. Her doctoral research was supervised by Joseph L. Schafer.

She joined the RAND Corporation in 1998 as an associate statistician, and was promoted to statistician in 2003. She was president of the American Statistical Association for the 2024 term.

== Recognition ==
Ghosh-Dastidar is a Fellow of the American Statistical Association, elected in 2016.
