= Wendy L. Martinez =

American statistician

Wendy Lynn Martinez (née Poston) is an American statistician. She directs the Mathematical Statistics Research Center of the Bureau of Labor Statistics, and is the coordinating editor of the journal Statistics Surveys (jointly sponsored by four major statistical societies). In 2018, Martinez was elected president of the American Statistical Association for the 2020 term.

With Angel R. Martinez, she is the author of two books on MATLAB-based computational statistics and exploratory data analysis: Computational Statistics Handbook with MATLAB (CRC Press, 2002; 2nd ed., 2007; 3rd ed., 2015), and Exploratory Data Analysis with MATLAB (CRC Press, 2004; 2nd ed., with Jeffrey Solka, 2010).

Wendy Poston was an undergraduate at Cameron University, graduating in 1989 with a double major in mathematics and physics. She earned a master's degree in aerospace engineering at George Washington University and the NASA Langley Research Center in 1991, and a Ph.D. in computational sciences and informatics, specializing in computational statistics, from George Mason University in 1995. Her dissertation, supervised by Edward Wegman, was Optimal Subset Selection Methods. She was a program officer at the Office of Naval Research beginning in 1997, and has also held adjunct faculty positions at Strayer University and George Mason University.

Martinez was elected as a Fellow of the American Statistical Association in 2006, and as a member of the International Statistical Institute in 2007. In 2017, she won the American Statistical Association Founders Award, "for outstanding leadership and support of statistical and multidisciplinary research that achieved technological development in the areas of defense and national security; for a sustained commitment to the ASA and the profession through service in multiple sections, local chapters, and committees, especially in the areas of computational statistics, government statistics, social statistics, and defense and national security; for editorial work, including as a coordinating editor of Statistics Surveys; and for support of statistical education opportunities for minorities and women." She was elected to the 2022 class of Fellows of the American Association for the Advancement of Science (AAAS).
