= William Kruskal =

American mathematician and statistician (1919–2005)

William Henry Kruskal
- Born: October 10, 1919; New York City
- Died: April 21, 2005 (aged 85); Chicago
- Education: Harvard University, Columbia University
- Known for: Kruskal–Wallis test
- Scientific career
- Fields: Statistics
- Workplaces: University of Chicago
- Doctoral advisor: Henry Scheffé and Howard Levene

William Henry Kruskal (/ˈkrʌskəl/; October 10, 1919 – April 21, 2005) was an American mathematician and statistician. He is best known for having formulated the Kruskal–Wallis one-way analysis of variance (together with W. Allen Wallis), a widely used nonparametric statistical method.

== Biography ==
Kruskal was born to a Jewish family in New York City to a successful fur wholesaler. His mother, Lillian Rose Vorhaus Kruskal Oppenheimer, became a noted promoter of origami during the early era of television. He was the oldest of five children, three of whom, including himself, became researchers in mathematics and physics; see Joseph Kruskal and Martin Kruskal. Kruskal left Antioch College to attend Harvard University, receiving bachelor's and master's degrees in mathematics in 1940 and 1941. He pursued a Ph.D. in mathematical sciences at Columbia University, graduating in 1955 under the supervision of Henry Scheffé and Howard Levene. During the Second World War, Kruskal served at the U.S. Naval Proving Ground in Dahlgren, Virginia. After brief stints working for his father and lecturing at Columbia, he joined the University of Chicago faculty as an instructor in statistics in 1950.

In 1958 he was elected as a Fellow of the American Statistical Association. He edited the Annals of Mathematical Statistics from 1958 to 1961, served as president of the Institute of Mathematical Statistics in 1971, and of the American Statistical Association in 1982. Kruskal retired as professor emeritus in 1990. In 1992 Kruskal was awarded the American Statistical Association Founders Award.

He died in Chicago in 2005.

== Notable works ==
- Kruskal, William H; Allen Wallis, W (1952). "Use of ranks in one-criterion analysis of variance". Journal of the American Statistical Association. 47 (260): 583–621. doi:10.2307/2280779. JSTOR 2280779.
- Goodman, Leo A; Kruskal, William H (1954). "Measures of association for cross classifications". Journal of the American Statistical Association. 49 (268): 732–764. doi:10.2307/2281536. JSTOR 2281536.
- Goodman, Leo A; Kruskal, William H (1959). "Measures of Association for Cross Classifications. II: Further Discussion and References". Journal of the American Statistical Association. 54 (285): 123–163. doi:10.2307/2282143. JSTOR 2282143.
- Goodman, Leo A; Kruskal, William H (1963). "Measures of association for cross classification III: Approximate Sampling Theory" (PDF). Journal of the American Statistical Association. 58 (302): 310–364. doi:10.2307/2283271. JSTOR 2283271.
- "The coordinate-free approach to Gauss-Markov estimation, and its application to missing and extra observations". Proceedings of the Fourth Berkeley Symposium on Mathematical Statistics and Probability. 1: 435–451. 1961.
- Kruskal, William (1968). "When are Gauss-Markov and least squares estimators identical? A coordinate-free approach". Annals of Mathematical Statistics. 39: 70–75. doi:10.1214/aoms/1177698505.
- Kruskal, William (December 1988). "Miracles and Statistics: The Casual Assumption of Independence (ASA Presidential address)". Journal of the American Statistical Association. 83 (404): 929–940. doi:10.1080/01621459.1988.10478682. JSTOR 2290117.
- Goodman, Leo A; Kruskal, William H (1979). Measures of Association for Cross Classifications. New York: Springer-Verlag. ISBN 0-387-90443-3.

The Springer monograph cited is a reprint of the three Goodman and Kruskal Journal of the American Statistical Association cited above.

There is a complete bibliography.
