= Kathy Ensor =

American statistician

Katherine Bennett Ensor is an American statistician specializing in numerous methods in computational and statistical analysis of time series data, stochastic process modeling, and estimation to forecast issues in public health, community informatics, computational finance, and environmental statistics.

Ensor is the Noah G. Harding Professor of Statistics and director of the Center for Computational Finance and Economic Systems at Rice University. From 2016–2022, she was director of the Kinder Institute Urban Data Platform, a data resource initiative for the Greater Houston area that includes the Texas Flood and COVID-19 registries. She is an executive team member for Houston Wastewater Epidemiology, a SARS-CoV-2 wastewater monitoring initiative between Rice University, the Houston Health Department, Houston Public Works, and the City of Houston. In August 2022, Houston Wastewater Epidemiology was named a National Wastewater Surveillance System (NWSS) Center of Excellence by the U.S. Centers for Disease Control and Prevention.

== Career and Research ==
Ensor's statistical and computational methods for the development of modeling frameworks pinpoint, track and forecast issues across a wide variety of fields.

Since the start of her academic career, a focus of her research has sought a deeper understanding of problems in energy, quantitative finance and risk management. In 2002, she collaborated with university and industry partners to establish the Center for Computational Finance and Economic Systems (CoFES). She has since continued to serve as the center's director and has developed numerous programs in graduate and undergraduate research and education.

Ensor is widely known for her expertise in community analytics, which has grown through her career-long commitment to environmental and health-based research. Through collaborations with cross-disciplinary groups of educators, scientists, engineers, and city and public health professionals, she has quantitatively assessed air quality and human exposure to environmental contaminants. The work has also included the discovery of a correlation between ozone and heart attacks, and of geographic patterns in severe asthma attacks in schoolchildren.

In May 2020, Ensor and collaborators at Rice University, the Houston Health Department, Houston Public Works, and the City of Houston, began conducting ongoing testing of the city's wastewater treatment system for the presence of SARS-CoV-2, the virus that causes COVID-19.

The wastewater monitoring system has also been adapted to provide public health information on seasonal influenza, the respiratory syncytial virus (RSV), mpox, measles, and up to 29 potential human pathogens.

As director of the Kinder Institute Urban Data Platform from 2016–2022, Ensor investigated historical Houston flood event trends and Hurricane Harvey and on the health and housing impacts of the COVID-19 pandemic and COVID-19 vaccines. Additional studies have investigated mitigating risk and the affects climate change.

Ensor advises on computational and statistical analysis in science and engineering as chair of the National Academy of Science, Engineering, and Medicine (NASEM) committee on Frontiers of Statistics in Science and Engineering: 2035 and Beyond. She is a member of the board of trustees for the National Science Foundation (NSF) Institute for Pure and Applied Mathematics (IPAM), a member of the scientific review board for the Health Effects Institute (HEI), and serves as chair of Section U (Statistics) for the American Association for the Advancement of Science (AAAS).

From 2024 to 2025 Ensor was a representative director of the criteria committee on behalf of ASA for the Computer Science Academic Board (CSAB) – an organization within the Accreditation Board for Engineering and Technology (ABET). She was the 117th president of the American Statistical Association's (ASA) board of directors (2021–2022) and vice president of ASA's board of directors from 2016 to 2018. She was a member of the National Academies of Sciences, Engineering and Medicine (NASEM) Committee on Applied and Theoretical Statistics (CATS) from 2015 to 2021.

Ensor earned bachelor's and master's degrees in mathematics from Arkansas State University in 1981 and 1982. She completed her Ph.D. in statistics in 1986 from Texas A&M University; her dissertation, supervised by H. Joseph Newton, was Some Results in Autoregressive Modeling. She has been on the Rice faculty since 1987.
