= David L. Banks =

American statistician

- Born: Baton Rouge, Louisiana
- Education: Virginia Tech (MS, 1982; PhD, 1984); University of Virginia (BA, 1977)
- Children: 2
- Awards: Fellow of the American Association for the Advancement of Science
- Scientific career
- Fields: Statistics
- Institutions: Carnegie Mellon University; National Institute of Standards and Technology; United States Department of Transportation; Food and Drug Administration; Duke University
- Thesis: A Nonparametric Bayesian Test (1984)
- Doctoral advisor: Irving John Good
- Website: www2.stat.duke.edu/~banks/

David L. Banks is an American statistician at Duke University.

== Biography ==
Banks was born in Baton Rouge, Louisiana. Banks obtained an M.S. in Applied Mathematics from Virginia Tech in 1982, followed by a Ph.D. in Statistics in 1984. He wrote a thesis titled A Nonparametric Bayesian Test, supervised by Irving John Good. He won an NSF Postdoctoral Research Fellowship in the Mathematical Sciences, which he took at UC Berkeley from 1984 to 1986. In 1986 he was a visiting assistant lecturer at the University of Cambridge, and then joined the Department of Statistics at Carnegie Mellon in 1987.

In 1997 he went to the National Institute of Standards and Technology, then served as chief statistician of the U.S. Department of Transportation, and finally joined the U.S. Food and Drug Administration in 2002. In 2003, he returned to academics at Duke University and is currently the director of the Statistical and Applied Mathematical Sciences Institute since 2018.

== Academic career ==
David Banks was the coordinating editor of the Journal of the American Statistical Association. He co-founded the journal Statistics and Public Policy and served as its editor. He co-founded the American Statistical Association’s Section on National Defense and Homeland Security, and has chaired that section, as well as the sections on Risk Analysis and on Statistical Learning and Data Mining. He has published 91 refereed articles, edited nine books, and written four monographs. He is a former editor of the Journal of the American Statistical Association; a founding editor of the journal Statistics, Politics and Policy; and a co-editor of the monograph Statistical Methods for Human Rights. He is a fellow of the Institute of Mathematical Statistics and the Royal Statistical Society. He has been a member of the board of directors of the American Statistical Association, and he is a past-President of the Classification Society. He has taught at the University of Cambridge and at Carnegie Mellon University; he was also Chief Statistician of the U.S. Department of Transportation. Additionally, he has served on six National Academies panels.

His research areas include models for dynamic networks, dynamic text networks, adversarial risk analysis (i.e., Bayesian behavioral game theory), human rights statistics, agent-based models, forensics, and certain topics in high-dimensional data analysis.

Banks is currently Professor of the Practice of Statistics at Duke University. In addition, Banks is in charge of the Modeling in the Economic and Social Sciences Focus Cluster, part of Duke's Freshman FOCUS Program. In 2015, Banks was recipient of the American Statistical Association's Founders Award.

=== Research ===
Banks coauthored a survey article in 2006 on statistical aspects of data quality, and another in 2009 on adversarial risk analysis. He also co-authored a chapter titled Network Analysis of Wikipedia in the book Statistical Methods in e-Commerce Research, published by Wiley in 2008. Moreover, Banks studied the use of social network analysis for understanding disaster response and discussed several mathematical models for the evolution of a network.
