= List of statisticians =

This list of statisticians lists people who have made notable contributions to the theories or application of statistics, or to the related fields of probability or machine learning. It includes the founders of statistics and others. It includes some 17th- and 18th-century mathematicians and polymaths whose work is regarded as influential in shaping the later discipline of statistics. Also included are various actuaries, economists, and demographers known for providing leadership in applying statistics to their fields.

== A ==
- Aalen, Odd Olai
- Abbey, Helen (1915–2001)
- Abbott, Edith (1876–1957)
- Abelson, Robert P. (1928–2005)
- Abramovitz, Moses (1912–2000)
- Achenwall, Gottfried (1719–1772)
- Adelstein, Abraham Manie (1916–1992)
- Adkins, Dorothy (1912–1975)
- Ahtime, Laura
- Aitchison, Beatrice (1908–1997)
- Aitchison, John (1926–2016)
- Aitken, Alexander (1895–1967)
- Akaike, Hirotsugu (1927–2009)
- Aliaga, Martha (1937–2011)
- Allan, Betty (1905–1952)
- Allen, R. G. D. (1906–1983)
- Allison, David B.
- Altman, Doug (1948–2018)
- Altman, Naomi
- Amemiya, Takeshi (1935–2026)
- Anderson, Oskar (1887–1960)
- Anderson, Theodore Wilbur
- Anderson-Cook, Christine (1966–)
- de Andrade, Mariza
- Anscombe, Francis (1918–2001)
- Anselin, Luc
- Antonovska, Svetlana (1952–2016)
- Armitage, Peter (1924–2024)
- Armstrong, Margaret
- Arrow, Kenneth
- Ash, Arlene
- Ashby, Deborah (1959–)
- Asher, Jana
- Ashley-Cooper, Anthony
- Austin, Oscar Phelps
- Ayres, Leonard Porter

== B ==
- Backer, Julie E. (1890–1977)
- Bahadur, Raghu Raj (1924–1997)
- Bahn, Anita K. (1920–1980)
- Bailar, Barbara A.
- Bailey, Rosemary A. (1947–)
- Bailey-Wilson, Joan (1953–)
- Baker, Rose
- Balding, David
- Bandeen-Roche, Karen
- Barber, Rina Foygel
- Barnard, George Alfred (1915–2002)
- Barnard, Mildred (1908–2000)
- Barnett, William A.
- Bartels, Julius
- Bartlett, M. S. (1910–2002)
- Bascand, Geoff
- Basford, Kaye
- Basu, Debabrata (1924–2001)
- Bates, Nancy
- Batcher, Mary
- Baxter, Laurence (1954–1996)
- Bayarri, M. J. (1956–2014)
- Bayes, Thomas (1702–1761)
- Beale, Calvin
- Becker, Betsy
- Bediako, Grace
- Behm, Ernst
- Benjamin, Bernard
- Benzécri, Jean-Paul (1932–2019)
- Berger, James
- Berkson, Joseph (1899–1982)
- Bernardo, José-Miguel
- Bernoulli, Jacob (1655–1705)
- Berry, Don
- Best, Alfred M. (1876–1958)
- Best, Nicky
- Betensky, Rebecca
- Beveridge, William
- Bhat, B. R.
- Bhat, P. N. Mari
- Bhat, U. Narayan (1934–2021)
- Bienaymé, Irénée-Jules
- Bienias, Julia
- Billiard, Lynne (1943–)
- Bingham, Christopher
- Bird, Sheila (1952–)
- Birnbaum, Allan (1923–1976)
- Bishop, Yvonne (–2015)
- Bisika, Thomas John
- Bixby, Lenore E. (1914–1994)
- Blackwell, David (1919–2010)
- Blankenship, Erin
- Bliss, Chester Ittner (1899–1979)
- Block, Maurice
- Bloom, David E.
- Blumberg, Carol Joyce
- Bock, Mary Ellen
- Boente, Graciela
- Bodio, Luigi
- Bodmer, Walter
- Bonferroni, Carlo Emilio (1892–1960)
- Booth, Charles
- Boreham, John
- Borror, Connie M. (1966–2016)
- Bortkiewicz, Ladislaus (1868–1931)
- Bose, R. C. (1901–1987)
- Boscovich, Roger Joseph (Ruđer Josip Bošković; Rogerius (Iosephus) Boscovicius (1711–1787)
- Botha, Roelof
- Bottou, Léon
- Bowley, Arthur Lyon (1869–1957)
- Bowman, Kimiko O. (1927–2019)
- Box, George E. P. (1919–2010)
- Boyle, Phelim
- Brad, Ion Ionescu de la (1818–1891)
- Brady, Dorothy (1903–1977)
- Brassey, Thomas
- Braverman, Amy
- Breiman, Leo
- Breslow, Norman (1941–2015)
- Brogan, Donna (1939–)
- Brooks, Steve
- Brown, Jennifer
- Brown, Lawrence D. (1940–2018)
- Broze, Laurence (1960–)
- Buck, Caitlin E. (1964–)
- Bunea, Florentina (1966–)
- Burgess, Warren Randolph
- Burns, Arthur F. (1904–1987)
- Burr, Irving W. (1908–1989)
- Butler, Margaret K. (1924–2013)
- Butucea, Cristina
- Buzek, Józef
- Bycroft, Christine

== C ==
- Cai, T. Tony
- Caird, James
- Calder, Kate
- Caldwell, John
- Cam, Lucien Le (1924–2000)
- Campion, Harry
- Candès, Emmanuel
- Cannon, Ann R.
- Carriquiry, Alicia L.
- Carroll, Mavis B. (1917–2009)
- Carson, Carol S.
- Cartwright, Ann (1925–)
- Carver, Harry C.
- Castles, Ian
- Cattaneo, Matias D.
- Çetinkaya-Rundel, Mine
- Chakrabarti, M. C.
- Chalmers, George (1742–1825)
- Chaloner, Kathryn (1954–2014)
- Chambers, John M.
- Champernowne, D. G. (1912–2000)
- Chand, Rattan (1955–)
- Chao, Anne
- Charles, Enid (1894–1972)
- Charlier, Carl (1862–1934)
- Chebyshev, Pafnuty (1821–1894)
- Chen, Louis Hsiao Yun
- Chen, Cathy Woan-Shu
- Chen, Jie
- Chernoff, Herman (1923–2026)
- Chervonenkis, Alexey (1938–2014)
- Chetwynd, Amanda
- Chiaromonte, Francesca
- Chow, Yuan-Shih (1924–2022)
- Chuang-Stein, Christy
- Chuprov, Alexander Alexandrovich (1874–1926)
- Chuprov, Alexander Ivanovich (1841–1908)
- Ciol, Marcia
- Citro, Constance F. (1942–)
- Claeskens, Gerda
- Claghorn, Kate (1864–1938)
- Clark, Colin (1905–1989)
- Clark, Cynthia (1942–)
- Clarke, Richard W. B. (1910–1975)
- Clayton, David (1944–)
- Clyde, Merlise A.
- Coale, Ansley J.
- Coats, Robert H. (1874–1960)
- Cochran, William Gemmell (1909–1980)
- Cockfield, Arthur
- Coghlan, Timothy Augustine (1856–1926)
- Cohen, Jacob
- Cohen, Joel E.
- Coifman, Ronald
- Coleman, David
- Collet, Clara (1860–1948)
- Coman, Katharine (1857–1915)
- Cook, Dianne
- Cook, Len (1949–)
- Cordeiro, Gauss Moutinho (1952–)
- Cornfield, Jerome (1912–1979)
- Cournot, Antoine Augustin (1801–1877)
- Courtney, Leonard
- Cover, Thomas M.
- Cowan, Cathy A.
- Cox, David (1924–2022)
- Cox, Gertrude Mary (1900–1978)
- Cox, Richard Threlkeld (1898–1991)
- Cramér, Harald (1893–1985)
- Crome, August Friedrich Wilhelm
- Crosby, James
- Cudmore, Sedley
- Cunliffe, Stella (1917–2012)
- Cutler, Adele
- Czado, Claudia
- Czekanowski, Jan
- Czitrom, Veronica

== D ==
- Dabrowska, Dorota
- Dagum, Estelle Bee
- Dale, Angela (1945–)
- Daniels, Henry (1912–2000)
- Dantzig, David van (1900–1959)
- Dantzig, George (1914–2005)
- Darby, Sarah
- Darwin, John (1923–2008)
- Dasgupta, Nairanjana
- Datta, Susmita
- David, Florence Nightingale (1909–1993)
- David, Herbert A. (1925–2014)
- Davidian, Marie
- Davies, Griffith (1788–1855)
- Davis, Kingsley (1908–1997)
- Dawid, Philip (1946–)
- Day, Besse (1889–1986)
- Daykin, Christopher (1948–)
- Dean, Angela
- Dean, Charmaine (1958–)
- Deane, Charlotte (1975–)
- DeGroot, Morris H. (1931–1989)
- Delaigle, Aurore
- DeLong, Elizabeth
- Deming, W. Edwards (1900–1993)
- Dempster, Arthur P. (1929–2026)
- Desrosières, Alain
- Dewey, Davis Rich
- Diaconis, Persi (1945–)
- Díaz, María del Pilar
- Diener-West, Marie
- Dietz, E. Jacquelin
- Dilke, Sir Charles
- Ditlevsen, Susanne
- Dixon, Wilfrid (1915–2008)
- Do, Kim-Anh
- Dobson, Annette (1945–)
- Dodge, Harold F.
- Dodson, James
- Doerge, Rebecca
- Doll, Sir Richard (1912–2005)
- Dominici, Francesca
- Donnelly, Christl
- Donnelly, Peter
- Donoho, David
- Doob, Joseph Leo
- Dublin, Louis Israel
- Duckworth, Frank
- Dudley, Richard M.
- Dudoit, Sandrine
- Dukic, Vanja
- Duncan, David F.
- Duncan, Otis Dudley
- Dunn, Halbert L.
- Dunn, Olive Jean (1915–2008)
- Dunnell, Karen (1946–)
- Dunnett, Charles
- Dupuis, Debbie
- Dupuis, Josée
- Durbin, James
- Dvoretzky, Aryeh

== E ==
- Easton, Brian
- Ebbinghaus, Hermann (1850–1909)
- Eberly, Lynn
- Eckler, A. Ross (1901–1991)
- Eckler, A. Ross Jr. (1927–2016)
- Eeden, Constance van (1927–2021)
- Eden, Sir Frederick (1766–1809)
- Edgeworth, Francis Ysidro (1845–1926)
- Edwards, A. W. F. (1935–)
- Efron, Bradley (1938–)
- Eisenhart, Churchill (1913–1994)
- Elashoff, Janet D.
- Elderton, Ethel M. (1878–1954)
- Elderton, William Palin
- Eldridge, Marie D. (1926–2009)
- Ellenberg, Jonas H.
- Ellenberg, Susan S.
- Elliot, Jane (1966–)
- Elston, Robert C.
- Engel, Ernst (1821–1896)
- Engle, Robert F.
- Ensor, Kathy
- Erlang, A. K. (1878–1929)
- Erritt, John
- Esterby, Sylvia
- Etheridge, Alison (1964–)
- Ezekiel, Mordecai

== F ==
- Fabri, Johann Ernst
- Fallati, Johannes
- Fan, Jianqing
- Farr, William (1807–1883)
- Farrer, Thomas
- Fechner, Gustav (1801–1887)
- Federer, Walter T. (1915-2008)
- Fellegi, Ivan (1935–)
- Feller, William
- Fernique, Xavier
- Fienberg, Stephen
- Finetti, Bruno de (1906–1985)
- Finlaison, John
- Finney, D. J. (1917–2018)
- Fisher, Irving (1867–1947)
- Fisher, Sir Ronald A. (1890–1962)
- Fitz-Gibbon, Carol (1938–2017)
- Fix, Evelyn (1904–1965)
- Fleetwood, William (1656–1723)
- Fleiss, Joseph L. (1937–2003)
- Flournoy, Nancy (1947–)
- Flux, A. William
- Foot, David
- Fowler, Henry
- Fox, John (1945–)
- Frankel, Lester
- Franscini, Stefano
- Freedman, David A.
- Freedman, Ronald
- Friedman, Milton
- Frigessi, Arnoldo di Rattalma (1959–)
- Frühwirth-Schnatter, Sylvia (1959–)
- Fu, Rongwei
- Fuentes, Montserrat
- Furlong, Cathy

== G ==
- Gage, Linda
- Gain, Anil Kumar (1919–1978)
- Gallant, A. Ronald
- Gallup, George (1901–1984)
- Galton, Francis (1822–1911)
- Gantert, Nina
- Gardner, Martha M.
- Garfield, Joan
- Gauquelin, Michel
- Gauss, Johann Carl Friedrich (1777–1855)
- Geary, Roy C.
- Geer, Sara van de (1958–)
- Geiringer, Hilda (1893–1973)
- Geisser, Seymour (1929–2004)
- Gel, Yulia
- Geller, Nancy (1944–)
- Gelman, Andrew (1965–)
- Geman, Donald (1943–)
- Genest, Christian (1957–)
- Geppert, Maria-Pia (1907–1997)
- Ghazzali, Nadia (1961–)
- Ghosh, Jayanta Kumar
- Ghysels, Eric
- Gibbons, Jean D. (1938–)
- Giblin, Lyndhurst (1872–1951)
- Giffen, Robert (1837–1910)
- Gijbels, Irène
- Gilbert, Ethel
- Gile, Krista
- Gilford, Dorothy M. (1919–2014)
- Gill, Richard D. (1951–)
- Gini, Corrado (1884–1965)
- Girolami, Mark (1963–)
- Glass, David
- Glass, Gene V. (1940–)
- Golbeck, Amanda L.
- Goldberg, Lisa
- Goldin, Rebecca
- Goldman, Samuel
- Goldschmidt, Christina
- Goldsmith, Selma Fine (1912–1962)
- Goldstein, Harvey
- Gompertz, Benjamin (1779–1865)
- Good, I. J. (1916–2009)
- Good, Phillip (1937–)
- Goodnight, James
- Gordon, Nancy
- Goschen, George
- Gosset, William Sealy (known as "Student") (1876–1937)
- Gotway Crawford, Carol A.
- Goulden, Cyril (1897–1981)
- Granger, Clive
- Graunt, John (1620–1674)
- Gray, Mary W. (1938–)
- Grebenik, Eugene
- Green, Peter
- Greenland, Sander
- Greenwood, Cindy
- Greenwood, Major (1880–1949)
- Griffiths, Robert
- Griliches, Zvi
- Grimmett, Geoffrey (1950–)
- Guerry, André-Michel
- Gumbel, Emil Julius (1891–1966)
- Guttman, Louis
- Guo, Ying
- Guy, William (1810–1885)
- Gy, Pierre (1924–2015)

== H ==
- Haberman, Steven (1951–)
- Hagood, Margaret Jarman (1907–1963)
- Hahn, Marjorie
- Haines, Linda M.
- Hájek, Jaroslav (1926–1974)
- Hajnal, John (1924–2008)
- Halabi, Susan
- Hald, Anders (1913–2007)
- Hall, Ian
- Hall, Peter Gavin (1951–2016)
- Halley, Edmond (1656–1742)
- Halloran, Betz
- Halmos, Paul (1916–2006)
- Hamaker, Ellen (1974–)
- Hamilton, Lord George (1845–1927)
- Hampe, Asta
- Hand, David (1950–)
- Harch, Bronwyn
- Harcourt, Alison
- Hardin, Garrett (1915–2003)
- Hardin, Jo
- Harris, Ted (1919–2006)
- Harter, Rachel M.
- Hartley, Herman Otto (1912–1980)
- Hastie, Trevor
- Hayek, Lee-Ann C.
- Hayter, Henry Heylyn (1821–1895)
- He, Xuming
- Healy, Michael (1923–2016)
- Hearron, Martha S. (1943–2014)
- Heckman, Nancy E.
- Hedges, Larry V.
- Hein, Jotun (1956–)
- Helmert, Friedrich Robert (1843–1917)
- Henderson, Charles Roy (1911–1989)
- Henningsen, Inge (1941–2024)
- Herring, Amy H.
- Herzberg, Agnes M. (1938–2026)
- Hertzberg, Vicki
- Hess, Irene
- Heyde, Chris (1939–2008)
- Hibbert, Sir Jack (1932–2005)
- Hickman, James C. (1927–2006)
- Hilbe, Joseph (1944–2017)
- Hill, Austin Bradford (1897–1991)
- Hill, Joseph Adna (1860–1938)
- Hinkley, David V.
- Hjort, Nils Lid (1953–)
- Ho, Weang Kee
- Hoeffding, Wassily (1914–1991)
- Hoem, Jan (1939–2017)
- Hoeting, Jennifer A.
- Hofmann, Heike (1972–)
- Hollander, Myles (1941–)
- Hollerith, Herman (1860–1929)
- Holmes, Chris
- Holmes, Susan P.
- Holran, Virginia Thompson
- Holt, Tim (1943–)
- Holtsmark, Gabriel Gabrielsen
- Hogben, Lancelot (1895–1975)
- Hooker, Reginald Hawthorn (1867–1944)
- Horn, Susan
- Hotelling, Harold (1895–1973)
- Hsiung, Chao Agnes
- Hsu, Pao-Lu
- Hu, Joan
- Hubert, Mia
- Huff, Darrell (1913–2001)
- Hughes-Oliver, Jacqueline
- Hunter, John Stuart
- Hunter, Sir William Wilson (1840–1900)
- Hunter, William (1937–1986)
- Hurwitz, Shelley
- Hušková, Marie (1942–)
- Hutchinson, Col
- Hutton, Jane
- Huzurbazar, Aparna V.
- Huzurbazar, Snehalata V.
- Huzurbazar, V. S.
- Hyndman, Rob J

== I ==
- Ihaka, Ross (1954–)
- Iman, Ronald L.
- Inoue, Lurdes
- Irony, Telba
- Irwin, Joseph Oscar (1898–1982)
- Isham, Valerie (1947–)
- Ishikawa, Kaoru (1915–1989)
- Isserlis, Leon (1881–1966)
- Ivy, Julie

== J ==
- Jacoby, Oswald (1902–1984)
- Jaffrey, Thomas (1861–1953)
- James, Bill (1949–)
- Jaynes, Edwin Thompson (1922–1998)
- Jefferys, William H. (1940–)
- Jeffreys, Harold (1891–1989)
- Jellinek, E. Morton (1890–1963)
- Jenkins, Gwilym (1933–1982)
- Jevons, William Stanley (1835–1882)
- Jobson, Alexander (1875–1933)
- Johnson, George (1837–1911)
- Johnson, Norman Lloyd (1917–2004)
- Johnston, Robert Mackenzie
- Jones, Edward
- Jones-Loyd, Samuel
- Jordan, Michael I.
- Jöreskog, Karl Gustav
- Jouffret, Esprit
- Juran, Joseph M. (1904–2008)
- Jurin, James (1684–1750)

== K ==
- Kac, Mark
- Kempthorne, Oscar
- Kendall, David George (1918–2007)
- Kendall, Sir Maurice (1907–1983)
- Kennedy, Joseph C. G.
- Khattree, Ravindra
- Khmaladze, Estate V.
- Kiefer, Jack
- Kiær, Anders Nicolai
- King, Gregory
- King, Willford I.
- Kingman, John (1939–)
- Kish, Leslie (1910–2000)
- Knibbs, George Handley
- Kočović, Bogoljub
- Kolmogorov, Andrey Nikolaevich (1903–1987)
- Koopman, Bernard
- Kott, Phillip
- Krewski, Dan
- Krumbein, William C.
- Kruskal, Joseph (1929–2010)
- Kruskal, William (1919–2005)
- Krüger, André
- Kuczynski, Robert René
- Kulischer, Eugene M.
- Kullback, Solomon (1907–1994)
- Kulldorff, Gunnar (1927–2015)
- Künsch, Hans-Rudolf
- Kurnow, Ernest
- Kuzmicich, Steve
- Kuznets, Simon

== L ==
- Lachenbruch, Peter A. (1937–2021)
- Lah, Ivo
- Laird, Nan
- Laplace, Pierre-Simon (1749–1827)
- Laslett, Peter
- Laspeyres, Étienne (1834–1913)
- Lathrop, Mark
- Law, John (1671–1729)
- Lawler, Gregory Francis
- Lawrence, Charles
- Legendre, Adrien-Marie (1752–1833)
- Lehmann, Erich Leo
- Lemon, Charles
- Leone, Fred C. (1922-2016)
- Leontief, Wassily
- Lewis, Tony
- Lexis, Wilhelm (1837–1914)
- Li, C. C.
- Li, David X.
- Likert, Rensis
- Lilliefors, Hubert (c. 1928–2008)
- Lindeberg, Jarl Waldemar (1876–1932)
- Lindley, Dennis V. (1923–2013)
- Lindstedt, Anders
- Linnik, Yuri (1915–1972)
- Liu, Jun
- Longman, Phillip
- Lord, Frederic M.
- Lorenz, Max O.
- Lotka, Alfred J. (1880–1949)
- Loève, Michel
- Lubbock, John
- Lundberg, Filip (1876–1965)

== M ==
- MacGregor, John F.
- Mahalanobis, Prasanta Chandra (1893–1972)
- Manwar, Khandakar Hossain (1930–1999)
- Mallet, Bernard
- Malthus, Thomas Robert (1766–1834)
- Mannheimer, Renato
- Mantel, Nathan (1919–2002)
- Mardia, Kantilal
- Marpsat, Maryse
- Marquardt, Donald (1929–1997)
- Marquis, Frederick
- Marschak, Jacob
- Marshall, Herbert
- Martin, Sir Richard
- Martin, Margaret E. (1912–2012)
- Martin, Margaret P. (1915–2012)
- Massey, Frank J. (1919–1995)
- Massey, Kenneth
- Masuyama, Motosaburo (1912–2005)
- Mauchly, John
- Mayer, Tobias (1723–1762)
- McClintock, Emory
- McCrossan, Paul
- McCullagh, Peter
- McEvedy, Colin
- McKendrick, Anderson Gray (1876–1943)
- McLennan, Bill
- McNemar, Quinn (1900–1986)
- McVean, Gilean
- Meeker, Royal
- Meier, Paul, (1924–2011)
- Meng, Xiao-Li (1963–)
- Mercado, Joseph
- Mihoc, Gheorghe
- Milliken, George A.
- Milliman, Wendell
- Mills, Frederick C. (1892–1964)
- Milne, Joshua
- Milnes, Richard Monckton
- Mitchell, Wesley Clair
- Mitofsky, Warren
- Mohn, Jakob
- Moivre, Abraham de
- Molina, Edward C.
- Mood, Alexander M. (1913–2009)
- Moore, Henry Ludwell
- Moran, Pat
- Mores, Edward Rowe
- Morgan, William
- Morris, Carl
- Morrison, Winifred J.
- Moser, Claus (1922–2015)
- Mosteller, Frederick (1916–2006)
- Mouat, Frederic J.
- Moyal, José Enrique
- Mukherjee, Bhramar
- Murphy, Susan

== N ==
- Nair, Vijayan N.
- Nason, Guy
- Neill, Charles P.
- Nelder, John (1924–2010)
- Nesbitt, Cecil J.
- Newmarch, William (1820–1882)
- Neyman, Jerzy (1894–1981)
- Nightingale, Florence (1820–1910)
- Niyogi, Partha (1967–2010)
- Noether, Gottfried E.
- Nordling, Carl O.
- Norwood, Janet L. (1923–2015)
- Notestein, Frank W.

== O ==
- Ogburn, William Fielding
- Olshansky, S. Jay
- Onicescu, Octav
- Onslow, William
- Orshansky, Mollie

== P ==
- Paine, George
- Pakington, John
- Panaretos, John
- Parzen, Emanuel (1929–2016)
- Pearl, Raymond
- Pearson, Egon (1895–1980)
- Pearson, Karl (1857–1936)
- Peirce, Charles Sanders
- Pereira, Basilio de Bragança
- Pena, Daniel
- Peto, Julian
- Peto, Richard
- Petty, William (1623–1687)
- Petty-Fitzmaurice, Henry
- Piekałkiewicz, Jan
- Pillai, K. C. Sreedharan
- Pillai, Vijayan K
- Pink, Brian
- Pitman, E. J. G. (1897–1993)
- Plackett, Robin
- Playfair, William (1759–1823)
- Pleszczyńska, Elżbieta
- Pocock, Stuart
- Poisson, Siméon Denis (1781–1840)
- Pollak, Henry O. (1927–2026)
- Polson, Nicholas
- Preston, Samuel H.
- Price, Richard
- Priestley, Maurice
- Princet, Maurice
- Proschan, Frank (1921–2003)
- Punnett, Reginald
- Pólya, George (1887–1985)
- Puri, Madan Lal (1929–)

== Q ==
- Quetelet, Adolphe (1796–1874)
- Qazi Motahar Hossain (1897–1981)

== R ==
- Chand Rattan (1955–)
- Raftery, Adrian
- Raghavarao, D.
- Raiffa, Howard
- Ralescu, Stefan (1952–)
- Rao, C.R. (1920–2023)
- Rasch, Georg (1901–1980)
- Redington, Frank
- Reid, Nancy
- Reiersøl, Olav (1908–2001)
- Rhodes, E. C.
- Rice, Thomas Spring
- Richardson, Sylvia
- Rickman, John
- Ripley, Brian Daniel (1952–)
- Robbins, Herbert (1922–2001)
- Robbins, Naomi (1937–)
- Roberts, Gareth O.
- Roberts, Harry V.
- Robertson, Stuart A.
- Robine, Jean-Marie
- Robins, James
- Robinson, Claude E.
- Rosenthal, Jeff
- Rousseeuw, Peter J.
- Roy, Bimal Kumar
- Roy, S. N. (1906–1966)
- Rubin, Donald
- Rubinow, I. M.
- Rubinstein, Reuven
- Ruggles, Steven
- Russell, John
- Ryder, Dudley

== S ==
- Sagarin, Jeff
- Saha, Jahar
- Saint-Maur, Nicolas-François Dupré de
- Salsburg, David
- Samuel, Herbert
- Samworth, Richard
- Sanders, William
- Savage, I. Richard (1925–2004)
- Savage, Leonard Jimmie (1917–1971)
- Sawilowsky, Shlomo (1954–2021)
- Scheffé, Henry (1907–1977)
- Schlaifer, Robert (1915–1994)
- Schultz, Henry
- Schuster, Arthur (1851–1934)
- Schweder, Tore (1943–2024)
- Scott, Elizabeth (1917–1988)
- Scurfield, Hugh Hedley
- Searle, Shayle R. (1928–2013)
- Sebastiani, Paola
- Semyonov-Tyan-Shansky, Pyotr (1827–1914)
- Shah, B. V.
- Shapiro, Samuel (1930–2023)
- Swamy, Subramanium
- Shapley, Lloyd (1923–2016)
- Shaw-Lefevre, George
- Shephard, Neil
- Shepp, Lawrence
- Sheppard, William Fleetwood (1863–1936)
- Shewhart, Walter A. (1891–1967)
- Shrikhande, S. S. (1917–2020)
- Sichel, Herbert (1915–1995)
- Siegel, Sidney
- Siegmund, David
- Silver, Nate
- Silvers, Abraham (1934–2021)
- Silverman, Bernard
- Simiand, François
- Simon, Leslie Earl
- Simpson, Thomas (1710–1761)
- Sinclair, Sir John (1754–1835)
- Sirkeci, Ibrahim
- Slutsky, Eugen (1880–1948)
- Smith, A.F.M
- Smith, Cedric (1917–2002)
- Smith, Walter L. (1926–2023)
- Snedecor, George W. (1881–1974)
- Snyder, Carl (1869–1946)
- Sokal, Robert R.
- Spearman, Charles (1863–1945)
- Speed, Terry
- Spengler, Joseph J.
- Spiegelhalter, David (1953–)
- Srivastava, J. N.
- Stamp, Josiah (1880–1941)
- Stanley, Julian C. Jr.
- Stanley, Edward
- Steele, J. Michael
- Steffensen, Johan Frederik (1873–1961)
- Stein, Charles
- Stephens, Matthew
- Hal S. Stern
- Stigler, Stephen (1941–)
- Stoffer, David S.
- Stone, Richard
- Stouffer, Samuel A.
- Stoyan, Dietrich (1940–)
- Sun, Jiayang
- Süssmilch, Johann Peter
- Sykes, William Henry
- Sylvester, James Joseph
- Sztrem, Edward Szturm de
- Shyamaprasad Mukherjee (1939–)

== T ==
- Taguchi, Genichi (1924–2012)
- Teitelbaum, Michael
- Telser, Lester G.
- Thiele, Thorvald N. (1838–1910)
- Thorndike, Robert L.
- Thornton, John Wingate
- Thorp, Willard
- Thurstone, Louis Leon
- Tibshirani, Robert
- Tippett, Leonard Henry Caleb
- Tobin, James
- Todd, Emmanuel
- Tong, Howell
- Trewin, Dennis
- Trybuła, Stanisław
- Tufte, Edward
- Tukey, John (1915–2000)

== U ==
- Utts, Jessica
- Uyanto, Stanislaus S.

== V ==
- Vaart, Aad van der (1959–)
- Vapnik, Vladimir (1936–)
- Vaupel, James
- Villani, Giovanni
- Visman, Jan

== W ==
- Wahba, Grace
- Wakefield, Edward (1774–1854)
- Wald, Abraham (1902–1950)
- Walker, Francis Amasa
- Walker, Gilbert
- Walker, Helen M. (1891–1983)
- Wallace, Chris (1933–2004)
- Wallis, W. Allen
- Wanless, Derek
- Waser, Johann Heinrich (1742-1780)
- Watson, Geoffrey
- Wedderburn, Robert
- Wegman, Edward
- Weibull, Waloddi (1887–1979)
- Weinstock, Arnold (1924–2002)
- Weldon, Walter Frank Raphael
- Welton, Thomas A.
- Wentworth-Fitzwilliam, Charles
- Westergaard, Harald Ludvig (1853–1936)
- Wheeler, Donald J.
- Whittle, Peter (1927–2021)
- Wickens, Aryness Joy (1901–1991)
- Wickham, Hadley
- Wilcoxon, Frank (1892–1965)
- Wilk, Martin (1922–2013)
- Wilkinson, Leland
- Wilks, Samuel S. (1906–1964)
- Willcox, Walter Francis
- Wilson, Edwin Bidwell (1879–1964)
- Wilson, Harold
- Wishart, John (1898–1956)
- Wold, Herman (1908–1992)
- Wolfowitz, Jacob (1910–1981)
- Wood, George Henry
- Woodroofe, Michael (1940–2022)
- Woolhouse, Wesley S. B.
- Working, Holbrook
- Wright, Carroll D.
- Wright, Elizur
- Wright, Sewall
- Wrigley, E. A.
- Wu, Jeff C. F.

== Y ==
- Yates, Frank (1902–1994)
- Young, Allyn Abbott
- Young, Arthur (1741–1820)
- Young, Hilton
- Yule, G. Udny (1871–1951)

== Z ==
- Zaltzman, Andy
- Zaman, Arif
- Zarnowitz, Victor
- Zellner, Arnold (1927–2010)
- Zhaohuan, Zhang (1925–2005)
- Žiberna, Aleš
- Zipf, George Kingsley (1902–1950)

== See also ==
- List of actuaries
- List of mathematical probabilists
- List of mathematicians
- Founders of statistics
