= Shih-Jen Hwang =

Taiwanese-American biostatistician and epidemiologist

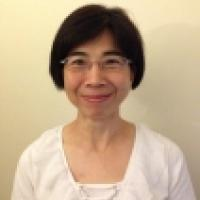
- Born: 1960 (age 65–66)
- Education: Kaohsiung Medical University (BS); National Taiwan University (MPH); Johns Hopkins University (MHS, PhD)
- Scientific career
- Fields: Biostatistics, epidemiology
- Workplaces: National Heart, Lung, and Blood Institute
- Thesis: Study of oral clefts: Search for genetic variability and gene-environment interaction (1994)

Shih-Jen Hwang (born 1960) is a Taiwanese-American biostatistician and epidemiologist. She is a staff scientist in the Laboratory for Cardiovascular Epidemiology and Genomics at the National Heart, Lung, and Blood Institute. She is an investigator on the Framingham Heart Study.

== Education ==
Hwang completed a B.S. in nursing at Kaohsiung Medical University and an M.P.H. in epidemiology at the National Taiwan University. She then earned an M.H.S. and Ph.D. in epidemiology at Johns Hopkins Bloomberg School of Public Health. Her 1994 doctoral dissertation was titled, Study of oral clefts: search for genetic variability and gene-environment interaction.

== Selected works ==
- Hwang, Shih-Jen; Beaty, Terri H.; Liang, Kung-Yee; Coresh, Josef; Khoury, Muin J. (1994-12-01). "Minimum Sample Size Estimation to Detect Gene-Environment Interaction in Case-Control Designs". American Journal of Epidemiology. 140 (11): 1029–1037. doi:10.1093/oxfordjournals.aje.a117193. ISSN 1476-6256. PMID 7985651.
- Hwang, Shih-Jen; Beaty, Terri H.; Panny, Susan R; Street, Nancy A.; Joseph, J. Mehsen; Gordon, Shiela; McIntosh, Iain; Francomano, Clair A. (1995-04-01). "Association Study of Transforming Growth Factor Alpha (TGFα) TaqI Polymorphismand Oral Clefts: Indication of Gene-Environment Interaction in a Population-based Sample of Infants with Birth Defects". American Journal of Epidemiology. 141 (7): 629–636. doi:10.1093/oxfordjournals.aje.a117478. ISSN 1476-6256. PMID 7702037.
- Hwang, Shih-Jen; Ballantyne, Christie M.; Sharrett, A. Richey; Smith, Louis C.; Davis, Clarence E.; Gotto, Antonio M.; Boerwinkle, Eric (1997-12-16). "Circulating Adhesion Molecules VCAM-1, ICAM-1, and E-selectin in Carotid Atherosclerosis and Incident Coronary Heart Disease Cases". Circulation. 96 (12): 4219–4225. doi:10.1161/01.CIR.96.12.4219. PMID 9416885.
