= Visman (disambiguation) =

Visman is a village in Iran. It may also refer to:

- Bart Visman (born 1962), Dutch composer
- Jan Visman (1914–2006), Dutch statistician
