= Panaretos =

Panaretos may refer to:

- Panaretos of Tamisos, Eastern Orthodox Exarch of Lithuania and bishop of Tamisos
- John Panaretos (born 1948), Greek educator and statistician
- Michael Panaretos (c. 1320 – c. 1390), Greek historian
- Phoebe Panaretos (born 1990), Australian actress and singer
- Victor Panaretos (born 1982), Greek mathematical statistician
