= Catherine Potenski =

American microbiologist and academic

Catherine J. Potenski
- Education: New York University Grossman School of Medicine
- Known for: Chief editor of Nature Genetics
- Scientific career
- Fields: Microbiology
- Workplaces: Nature Genetics
- Thesis: Q/N-rich protein aggregates and prions in the yeast model system
- Doctoral advisor: Irina Derkatch

Catherine J. Potenski is an American microbiologist and the former chief editor of Nature Genetics.

== Education ==
Potenski obtained a PhD in microbiology from New York University Grossman School of Medicine for her research on Q/N-rich protein aggregates and prions in the yeast model system. At the university she worked in Irina Derkatch's laboratory.

== Career ==
Potenski did five years of postdoctoral research on mechanisms of ribonucleotide-induced DNA damage in yeast working with Hannah Klein.

In 2015 she joined Nature Genetics, and was chief editor from 2019 to 2022.
