= Mark Lathrop =

Canadian genomic researcher (born 1950)

- Born: 1950 (age 75–76)
- Citizenship: Canada
- Education: University of Alberta; University of Washington (Ph.D)
- Known for: genomic research
- Awards: Ordre national du Mérite; Legion of Honour
- Scientific career
- Fields: biostatistics, genetics
- Workplaces: University of Oxford; Centre d’Étude du Polymorphisme Humain; Centre National de Génotypage; McGill University
- Website: https://genomic.medicine.mcgill.ca/investigator/mark-lathrop

Mark Lathrop (born 1950) is a Canadian genomic researcher and Biostatistician. He headed the Center for the Study of Human Polymorphisms in France. As of 2011, he is the Scientific Director of the McGill University and Génome Québec Innovation Centre in 2011. His research is focused on "the application of genomics and statistical/mathematical methods to understand the molecular basis of human disease."

== Education ==
Lathrop earned his undergraduated and master's degrees at the University of Alberta. He then studied theoretical statistics and genetics at the University of Washington, where he earned his PhD in biomathematics.

== Career ==
After completing his doctorate, Lathrop moved to France. There he founded the Center for the Study of Human Polymorphism. In the 1980s and 1990s, the Centre was at the forefront of research on the human genome.

Lathrop, recruited by Sir John Bell, moved to Oxford, England in 1993, where he became co-founder and director of Wellcome Trust Centre for Human Genetics (WHG) at the University of Oxford.

In 1998, he returned to France where he founded the Centre National de Génotypage (CNG), France's national centre for the study human genetics.

In 2011, Lathrop returned to Canada to McGill University, where he was named the Scientific Director of the McGill University Genome Centre, and a Professor in the Department of Human Genetics. His current research focuses on "using genetic approaches to identify DNA variants that predispose people to common diseases", especially, "lung cancer, asthma and cardiovascular disease."

== Honors ==
Lathrop has been honored with the French National Award of Merit and French Legion of Honour.

== Personal ==
Lathrop has dual citizenship - in Canada and France.

== Bibliography ==
- Hung, Rayjean J; McKay James D; Gaborieau Valerie; et al. (April 2008). "A susceptibility locus for lung cancer maps to nicotinic acetylcholine receptor subunit genes on 15q25" (PDF). Nature. 452 (7187): 633–7. Bibcode:2008Natur.452..633H. doi:10.1038/nature06885. hdl:2318/102453. PMID 18385738. S2CID 4418808.
- Moffatt, Miriam F; Kabesch Michael; et al. (July 2007). "Genetic variants regulating ORMDL3 expression contribute to the risk of childhood asthma" (PDF). Nature. 448 (7152): 470–3. Bibcode:2007Natur.448..470M. doi:10.1038/nature06014. hdl:2027.42/62682. PMID 17611496. S2CID 4373589.
- Bouzigon, Emmanuelle; Corda Eve; Aschard Hugues; Dizier Marie-Hélène; Boland Anne; Bousquet Jean; Chateigner Nicolas; Gormand Frédéric; Just Jocelyne; Le Moual Nicole; Scheinmann Pierre; Siroux Valérie; Vervloet Daniel; Zelenika Diana; Pin Isabelle; Kauffmann Francine; Lathrop Mark; Demenais Florence (November 2008). "Effect of 17q21 variants and smoking exposure in early-onset asthma". N. Engl. J. Med. 359 (19): 1985–94. doi:10.1056/NEJMoa0806604. PMID 18923164.
- Spanagel, Rainer; Pendyala Gurudutt; Abarca Carolina; Zghoul Tarek; Sanchis-Segura Carles; Magnone Maria Chiara; Lascorz Jesús; Depner Martin; Holzberg David; Soyka Michael; Schreiber Stefan; Matsuda Fumihiko; Lathrop Mark; Schumann Gunter; Albrecht Urs (January 2005). "The clock gene Per2 influences the glutamatergic system and modulates alcohol consumption" (PDF). Nat. Med. 11 (1): 35–42. doi:10.1038/nm1163. ISSN 1078-8956. PMID 15608650. S2CID 11106714.
- Kathiresan, S; Willer; Peloso; Demissie; et al. (December 2008). "Common variants at 30 loci contribute to polygenic dyslipidemia". Nat. Genet. 41 (1): 56–65. doi:10.1038/ng.291. PMC 2881676. PMID 19060906.
- McKay, James D; Hung Rayjean J; et al. (December 2008). "Lung cancer susceptibility locus at 5p15.33". Nat. Genet. 40 (12): 1404–6. doi:10.1038/ng.254. PMC 2748187. PMID 18978790.
- Barrett, Jeffrey C; Hansoul Sarah; et al. (August 2008). "Genome-wide association defines more than thirty distinct susceptibility loci for Crohn's disease". Nat. Genet. 40 (8): 955–62. doi:10.1038/ng.175. PMC 2574810. PMID 18587394.
- Saar Kathrin; et al. (The STAR Consortium) (May 2008). "SNP and haplotype mapping for genetic analysis in the rat". Nat. Genet. 40 (5): 560–6. doi:10.1038/ng.124. PMC 5915293. PMID 18443594.
- Willer, Cristen J; Sanna, S; Jackson, AU; Scuteri, A; Bonnycastle, LL; Clarke, R; Heath, SC; Timpson, NJ; et al. (February 2008). "Newly identified loci that influence lipid concentrations and risk of coronary artery disease". Nat. Genet. 40 (2): 161–9. doi:10.1038/ng.76. PMC 5206900. PMID 18193043.
- Wellcome Trust Case Control Consortium; Australo-Anglo-American Spondylitis Consortium (TASC); Burton, PR; Clayton, DG; Cardon, LR; Craddock, N; Deloukas, P; Duncanson, A; et al. (November 2007). "Association scan of 14,500 nsSNPs in four common diseases identifies variants involved in autoimmunity". Nat. Genet. 39 (11): 1329–37. doi:10.1038/ng.2007.17. PMC 2680141. PMID 17952073.
- Dixon, Anna L; Liang Liming; Moffatt Miriam F; Chen Wei; Heath Simon; Wong Kenny C C; Taylor Jenny; Burnett Edward; Gut Ivo; Farrall Martin; Lathrop G Mark; Abecasis Gonçalo R; Cookson William O C (October 2007). "A genome-wide association study of global gene expression". Nat. Genet. 39 (10): 1202–7. doi:10.1038/ng2109. PMID 17873877. S2CID 13182548.
- Menzel, Stephan; Garner Chad; Gut Ivo; Matsuda Fumihiko; Yamaguchi Masao; Heath Simon; Foglio Mario; Zelenika Diana; Boland Anne; Rooks Helen; Best Steve; Spector Tim D; Farrall Martin; Lathrop Mark; Thein Swee Lay (October 2007). "A QTL influencing F cell production maps to a gene encoding a zinc-finger protein on chromosome 2p15". Nat. Genet. 39 (10): 1197–9. doi:10.1038/ng2108. PMID 17767159. S2CID 19615925.
- Fischer, Judith; Lefèvre Caroline; Morava Eva; Mussini Jean-Marie; Laforêt Pascal; Negre-Salvayre Anne; Lathrop Mark; Salvayre Robert (January 2007). "The gene encoding adipose triglyceride lipase (PNPLA2) is mutated in neutral lipid storage disease with myopathy". Nat. Genet. 39 (1): 28–30. doi:10.1038/ng1951. ISSN 1061-4036. PMID 17187067. S2CID 23679419.
- Delmaghani, Sedigheh; del Castillo Francisco J; Michel Vincent; Leibovici Michel; Aghaie Asadollah; Ron Uri; Van Laer Lut; Ben-Tal Nir; Van Camp Guy; Weil Dominique; Langa Francina; Lathrop Mark; Avan Paul; Petit Christine (July 2006). "Mutations in the gene encoding pejvakin, a newly identified protein of the afferent auditory pathway, cause DFNB59 auditory neuropathy". Nat. Genet. 38 (7): 770–8. doi:10.1038/ng1829. ISSN 1061-4036. PMID 16804542. S2CID 2443891.
- Sakuntabhai, Anavaj; Turbpaiboon, C; Casadémont, I; Chuansumrit, A; Lowhnoo, T; Kajaste-Rudnitski, A; Kalayanarooj, SM; Tangnararatchakit, K; et al. (May 2005). "A variant in the CD209 promoter is associated with severity of dengue disease". Nat. Genet. 37 (5): 507–13. doi:10.1038/ng1550. ISSN 1061-4036. PMC 7096904. PMID 15838506.
- Auwerx, Johan; Avner, P; Baldock, R; Ballabio, A; Balling, R; Barbacid, M; Berns, A; Bradley, A; et al. (September 2004). "The European dimension for the mouse genome mutagenesis program". Nat. Genet. 36 (9): 925–7. doi:10.1038/ng0904-925. ISSN 1061-4036. PMC 2716028. PMID 15340424.
- Gut, Ivo G; Lathrop G Mark (August 2004). "Duplicating SNPs". Nat. Genet. 36 (8): 789–90. doi:10.1038/ng0804-789. ISSN 1061-4036. PMID 15284844. S2CID 20840537.
- Allen, Maxine; Heinzmann Andrea; Noguchi Emiko; Abecasis Gonçalo; Broxholme John; Ponting Chris P; Bhattacharyya Sumit; Tinsley Jon; Zhang Youming; Holt Richard; Jones E Yvonne; Lench Nick; Carey Alisoun; Jones Helene; Dickens Nicholas J; Dimon Claire; Nicholls Rosie; Baker Crystal; Xue Luzheng; Townsend Elizabeth; Kabesch Michael; Weiland Stephan K; Carr David; von Mutius Erika; Adcock Ian M; Barnes Peter J; Lathrop G Mark; Edwards Mark; Moffatt Miriam F; Cookson William O C M (November 2003). "Positional cloning of a novel gene influencing asthma from chromosome 2q14". Nat. Genet. 35 (3): 258–63. doi:10.1038/ng1256. ISSN 1061-4036. PMID 14566338. S2CID 40595323.
- Caulfield, Mark; Munroe Patricia; Pembroke Janine; Samani Nilesh; Dominiczak Anna; Brown Morris; Benjamin Nigel; Webster John; Ratcliffe Peter; O'Shea Suzanne; Papp Jeanette; Taylor Elizabeth; Dobson Richard; Knight Joanne; Newhouse Stephen; Hooper Joel; Lee Wai; Brain Nick; Clayton David; Lathrop G Mark; Farrall Martin; Connell John (June 2003). "Genome-wide mapping of human loci for essential hypertension". Lancet. 361 (9375): 2118–23. doi:10.1016/S0140-6736(03)13722-1. PMID 12826435. S2CID 6625775.
