= Paola Sebastiani =

Paola Sebastiani is a biostatistician and a professor at Boston University working in the field of genetic epidemiology, building prognostic models that can be used for the dissection of complex traits. Her research interests include Bayesian modeling of biomedical data, particularly genetic and genomic data.

== Education and career ==
Sebastiani obtained a first degree in mathematics from the University of Perugia, Italy (1987), an M.Sc. in statistics from University College London (1990), and a Ph.D. in statistics from the Sapienza University of Rome (1992). She came to Boston University in 2003, after previously having been an assistant professor in the Department of Mathematics and Statistics at the University of Massachusetts Amherst.

== Contributions ==
Her most important contribution is a model based on a Bayesian network that integrates more than 60 single-nucleotide polymorphisms (SNPs) and other biomarkers to compute the risk for stroke in patients with sickle cell anemia. This model was shown to have high sensitivity and specificity and demonstrated, for the first time, how an accurate risk prediction model of a complex genetic trait that is modulated by several interacting genes can be built using Bayesian networks.

A controversial paper regarding the genetics of aging with which she was associated was retracted from the journal Science in 2011 due to flawed data. The corrected version was published in PLOS ONE, and several of the genes found associated with exceptional human longevity were replicated in other studies of centenarians.

== Publications ==
She has published several peer-reviewed papers. According to Scopus the most cited ones are:

- Ramoni M.F.; Sebastiani P.; Kohane I.S. (2002). "Cluster analysis of gene expression dynamics" (2002)". Proceedings of the National Academy of Sciences of the United States of America. 99 (14): 9121–9126. doi:10.1073/pnas.132656399. PMC 123104. PMID 12082179.
- Sebastiani P.; Ramoni M.F.; Nolan V.; Baldwin C.T.; Steinberg M.H. (2005). "Genetic dissection and prognostic modeling of overt stroke in sickle cell anemia" (2005)". Nature Genetics. 37 (4): 435–440. doi:10.1038/ng1533. PMC 2896308. PMID 15778708.
- Mandl K.D.; Overhage J.M.; Wagner M.M.; Lober W.B.; Sebastiani P.; Mostashari F.; Pavlin J.A.; Gesteland P.H.; Treadwell T.; Koski E.; Hutwagner L.; Buckeridge D.L.; Aller R.D.; Grannis S. (2003). "Implementing syndromic surveillance: A practical guide informed by the early experience" (2004)". Journal of the American Medical Informatics Association. 11 (2): 141–150. doi:10.1197/jamia.m1356. PMC 353021. PMID 14633933.
- Sebastiani P.; Gussoni E.; Kohane I.S.; Ramoni M.F.; Baker H.V. (2003). "Statistical challenges in functional genomics" (2003)". Statistical Science. 18 (1): 33–70. doi:10.1214/ss/1056397486.

== Awards and honors ==
She became a fellow of the American Statistical Association in 2017.
