= Limin Peng =

Chinese biostatistician

Liming Peng is a Chinese biostatistician who works as a professor of biostatistics and bioinformatics at the Rollins School of Public Health, Emory University, where she is also affiliated with the Winship Cancer Institute. The topics of her statistical research include survival analysis, quantile regression, and nonparametric statistics; she applies these methods to the study of chronic diseases including diabetes and cystic fibrosis.

== Education and career ==
Peng earned a master's degree in probability theory and mathematical statistics from the University of Science and Technology of China. She completed her Ph.D. at the University of Wisconsin–Madison in 2005. Her dissertation, Contributions to Semi-Competing Risks Data, was jointly supervised by Rick Chappell and Jason Fine.

Peng joined Emory as Rollins Assistant Professor in 2005. At Emory, she is a long-term and frequent collaborator with two other women in biostatistics, Amita Manatunga and Ying Guo.

== Recognition ==
Peng was elected as a Fellow of the American Statistical Association in 2016. In 2017, she won the Mortimer Spiegelman Award of the American Public Health Association. She was named to the 2022 class of Fellows of the Institute of Mathematical Statistics, for "innovative and significant contributions to statistical methodology for survival analysis, quantile regression, and high-dimensional inference, and for dedicated professional service".
