= Josef Coresh =

American epidemiologist

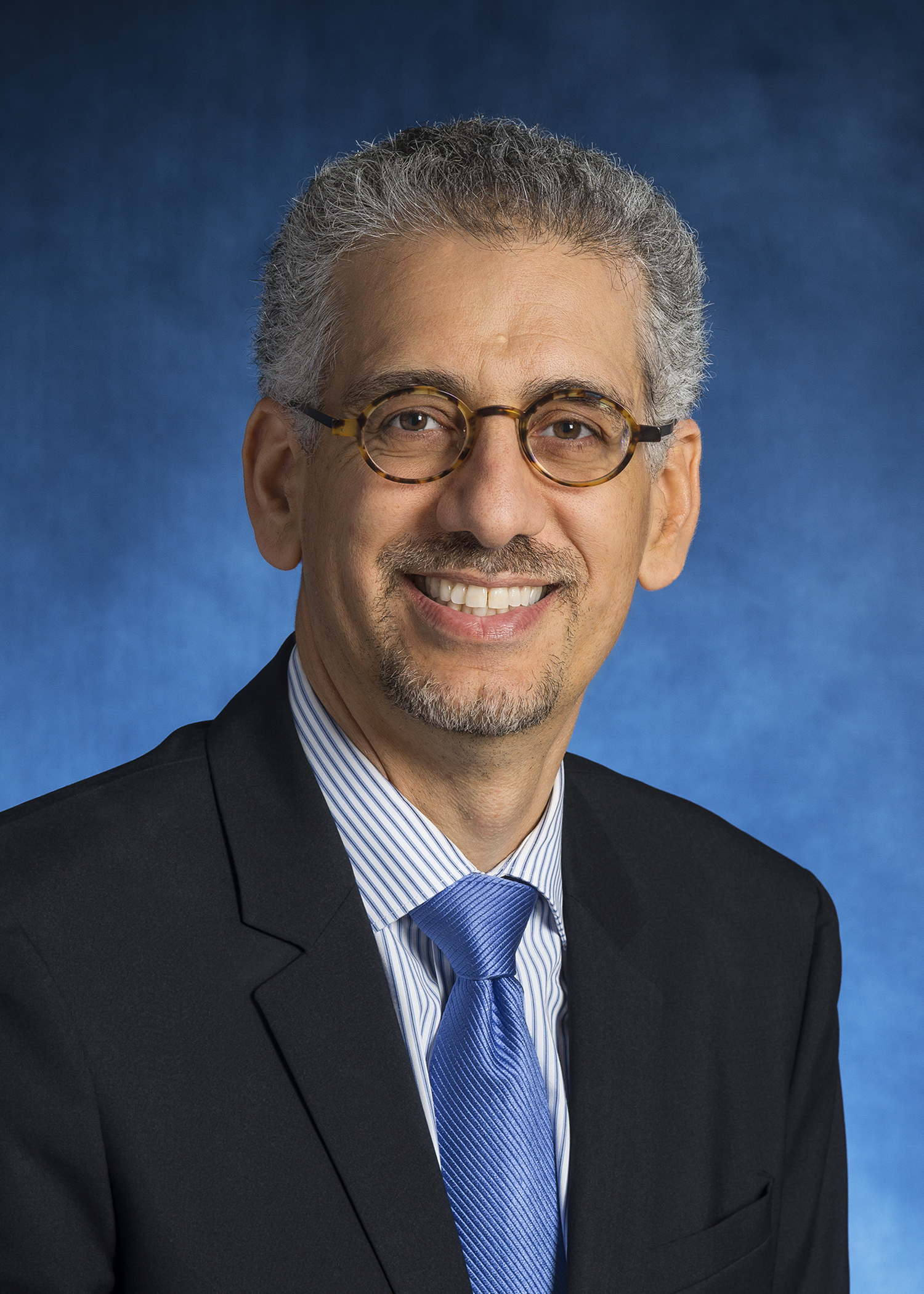

Academic background
- Education: BS, Mathematics, Princeton University; MHS, PhD, 1992, Johns Hopkins Bloomberg School of Public Health; MD, 1992, Johns Hopkins University
- Thesis: Genetic epidemiology of Apolipoprotein B (1992img)

Josef Coresh is an American epidemiologist. He is the Terry and Mel Karmazin Professor of Population Health, a Professor in the Department of Medicine, and the Founding Director of the Optimal Aging Institute at NYU Langone Health. He was previously the inaugural George W. Comstock Professor in the Department of Epidemiology at Johns Hopkins University, and the director of both the Cardiovascular Epidemiology Training Program and the George W. Comstock Center for Public Health Research and Prevention at Johns Hopkins School of Medicine.

== Early life and education ==
Coresh attended Princeton University for his bachelor's degree in mathematics before enrolling at Johns Hopkins University for his medical degree, master's degree, and PhD.

== Career ==
During his over 30-year tenure at Johns Hopkins, Dr. Coresh studied risk factors for vascular disease across different organs including the heart, kidney and brain with the goal of improving health and research. He developed a population-based longitudinal proteomic study of health in the ARIC (Atherosclerosis Risk in Communities) Study population. He used data of nearly 5000 proteins over three decades to gain insights into novel risk factors and pathways for dementia, heart disease, cancer and aging. Coresh also led the Cardiovascular Epidemiology Training Program at the Bloomberg School since 1997. In this role, he was recognized with the AHA Lifestyle Council Mentorship Award as "a person who has provided exceptional individual and institutional mentoring and advocacy for cardiovascular epidemiology researchers." His mentees included Elizabeth Selvin and Morgan Grams.

In 2007, his paper "Prevalence of chronic kidney disease in the United States" was ranked by Essential Science Indicators as one of the 20 most-cited "Hot Papers" over all fields and a "Highly Cited Paper in Clinical Medicine." The following year, he was appointed both the Cardiovascular Epidemiology Training Program and the George W. Comstock Center for Public Health Research and Prevention at the Johns Hopkins School of Medicine. Later, Coresh was appointed vice-chair of the National Kidney Foundation's Kidney Disease Outcomes Quality Initiative workgroup (for the Clinical Practice Guideline "Chronic Kidney Disease: Evaluation, Classification and Stratification") which has also led to his increased involvement in the international effort to address the public health burden of chronic kidney disease. In 2009, Coresh was the co-author of "Identification of a urate transporter, ABCG2, with a common functional polymorphism causing gout" which received the PNAS paper Cozzarelli Prize for outstanding scientific excellence and originality. The following year, the National Kidney Foundation gave Coresh the Garabed Eknoyan Award for his contributions to the field. He was also the recipient of the American Heart Association's Epidemiology and Prevention Mentoring Award.

As the leader of the Chronic Kidney Disease Prognosis Consortium, Coresh analyzed data from 1.7 million participants recruited into 35 cohorts in dozens of countries from 1975 to 2011 and followed for an average of 5 years. He used this data to suggest that new therapies for kidney disease by revising the definition of kidney disease progression used during clinical trials. Due to his overall research, Coresh was the recipient of the 2015 National Kidney Foundation's David Hume Award, their highest honor given to individuals "who exemplifies the high ideals of scholarship and humanism in an outstanding manner."

In fall 2020, Dr. Coresh co-authored a kidney study using international data from over nine million individuals "to develop and validate a risk-scoring calculation that adds blood and urine measures of kidney disease to the current standard method in the United States for assessing cardiovascular disease risk." In October 2020, he was the recipient of the Belding H. Scribner Lifetime Achievement Award from the American Society of Nephrology for his career-long contributions to the practice of nephrology.

In 2023, Dr. Coresh joined NYU Grossman School of Medicine, a part of NYU Langone Health.
