= Joan Bailey-Wilson =

American statistical geneticist

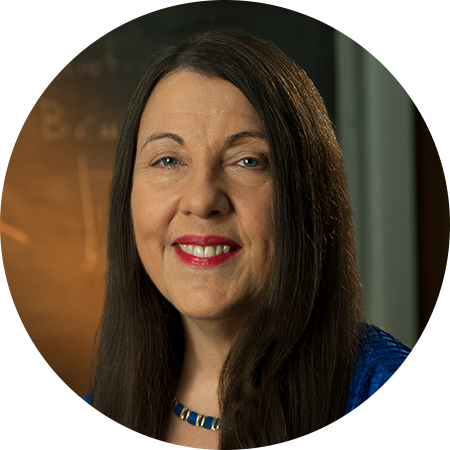
- Born: 1953 (age 72–73)
- Education: Western Maryland College (B.A.); Indiana University School of Medicine (Ph.D.)
- Spouse: Alexander F. Wilson (m. 1978)
- Children: 2
- Scientific career
- Fields: Statistical genetics
- Workplaces: Medical Center of Louisiana at New Orleans; National Human Genome Research Institute
- Doctoral advisor: Joe C. Christian

Joan Ellen Bailey-Wilson (born 1953) is an American statistical geneticist. She is a Scientist Emerita at the National Human Genome Research Institute (NHGRI), where she previously served as a senior investigator and co-chief of the Computational and Statistical Genomic Branch of the Institute. She retired from her active research position in September 2022.

== Education ==
Bailey-Wilson received a B.A. magna cum laude in Biology from Western Maryland College followed by a Ph.D. in medical genetics with a minor in biomathematics from Indiana University School of Medicine in 1981 under the direction of Joe C. Christian. She completed post-doctoral training with Robert Elston in the Department of Biometry and Genetics at Louisiana State University Medical Center.

== Career ==
Bailey-Wilson became a professor at the Medical Center of Louisiana at New Orleans before joining the National Institutes of Health in 1995. She was appointed co-branch chief of the Inherited Disease Research Branch in 2006 and became co-chief of the Computational and Statistical Genomics Branch at the National Human Genome Research Institute in 2014. Her research program focused on understanding the genetic factors that increase risk for various complex diseases and their interactions with environmental risk factors. She specialized in statistical genetics and genetic epidemiology and is especially interested in risk factors for lung cancer, prostate cancer, eye disorders, autism and oral clefts.

She has served on many scientific advisory boards including the Cancer Family Registry (CFRCCS) Advisory Board, the "World Trade Center Kinship and Data Analysis Panel" for the National Institute of Justice and the Genetic Analysis Workshop Advisory Board. She also served as a member of the International Genetic Epidemiology Society (IGES) Board of Directors (1999-2001), as IGES president-elect, president and past president (2006-2008) and as chair of the IGES Ethical, Legal and Social Issues committee.

== Research ==
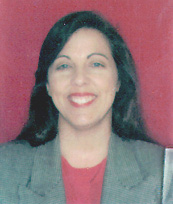
Bailey-Wilson in 2002.

Bailey-Wilson's research focuses on a range of diseases, including lung cancer, prostate cancer, myopia and other eye diseases, autism and cleft lip and palate. Trained in statistical genetics, she is interested in understanding the genetics of complex diseases and developing novel methodologies to disentangle the roles that genes and environment play in disease causation. She has been particularly interested in lung cancer since the early 1980s, when very few scientists believed there might be a genetic link to the condition. Today, significantly more data support the idea that there are susceptibility alleles for one or more unknown genes that dramatically increase certain smokers' risk of developing lung cancer. In a collaboration called the Genetic Epidemiology of Lung Cancer Consortium (GELCC), Bailey-Wilson and others recently narrowed down the location of a potential lung-cancer gene to a region of chromosome 6, and showed that RGS17 is a tumor suppressor gene in this region that shows association with lung cancer risk in highly aggregated lung cancer families. With her collaborators, she is using dense genotyping panels and next-generation DNA sequencing in the GELCC's set of highly aggregated lung cancer families, their family-history-positives cases, and age-gender-smoking matched controls to search for causal variants in additional lung cancer susceptibility loci.

Bailey-Wilson has used similar approaches to locate other cancer-related genes. For example, she and her collaborators published evidence that genes involved in prostate cancer reside on specific regions of chromosomes 1, 8, 17 and X. These findings have been replicated, and three candidate genes with rare variants that appear to increase prostate cancer risk have been cloned: RNASEL (HPC1), which encodes ribonuclease L, MSRI, which encodes the macrophage scavenger receptor 1 and HOXB13, which encodes the homeobox B13 protein. Bailey-Wilson is focusing on identifying additional susceptibility genes for these and other cancers in ongoing studies. At present, she is collaborating with the International Consortium for Prostate Cancer Genetics on a whole exome sequencing study of families with strong family history of prostate cancer and is the lead statistician on the study of the ICPCG's African-American families.

Bailey-Wilson is also applying these next-generation sequencing tools to her studies of highly aggregated non-syndromic oral cleft families from the Syrian Arab Republic (2 to 17 affected individuals per family) and to a set of multiplex autism spectrum disease families. In the autism study, a subset of families in which at least one child with autism also has abnormal cholesterol levels are of particular interest.

Bailey-Wilson develops and tests novel computational methods to analyze genetic markers. Her group is especially interested in using machine learning methods to detect causal variants that have limited or no marginal effects on risk of a disease but which do show strong interaction effects (with either other genetic variants or with environmental risk factors). She is also working to address the effects of linkage disequilibrium, or the nonrandom association of closely spaced loci, on genetic interaction tests and machine learning methods. Linkage disequilibrium can be caused by a low frequency of recombinations between two loci when they are very close together on a chromosome. The closer two loci are, the more likely they are to exhibit linkage disequilibrium. Thus, markers that are only 100 kb apart display significantly greater linkage disequilibrium than markers that are 100–5,000 kb apart. Because standard linkage analysis methods typically assume no linkage disequilibrium exists between loci, Bailey-Wilson's group has developed approaches to streamline these methods to study sets of dense genetic markers. She is using association methods that take advantage of linkage disequilibrium data, HapMap data, and the sequence of the human genome to determine the location of genetic loci that increase risk for various diseases. She has used these and other analytical methods to determine, for example, whether alleles at specific marker loci are transmitted along with a disease through generations in families with several affected members.

Bailey-Wilson has also used statistical methods to determine the marker alleles that people with a specific disease carry more frequently - and disease-free people carry less frequently - than can be explained by chance. This work has helped to greatly reduce the number of target regions that investigators need to search for potential disease-related genes. Her group is also developing approaches to mitigate the increased false-positive evidence of epistatic interaction that can be observed when strong LD exists between variants within a single genetic locus that all have a marginal effect on the trait.

== Awards and honors ==
Bailey-Wilson has received a number of awards and honors, including the Distinguished Alumnus Award from the Department of Medical Genetics, Indiana University School of Medicine (1995), the Trustee's Alumni Award from Western Maryland College (1998), the Leadership Award from the International Genetic Epidemiology Society (2006), induction as an alumni member into Phi Beta Kappa (2010) and the NHGRI Outstanding Mentor Award (2011). Bailey-Wilson is a diplomat of the American Board of Medical Genetics and a founding fellow of the American College of Medical Genetics.

== Personal life ==
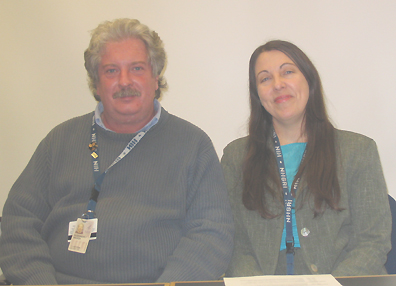
Alexander F. Wilson and Joan Bailey-Wilson, co-chiefs of the Inherited Disease Research Branch, NHGRI, at Baltimore's Bayview campus. She heads the Statistical Genetics Section, and he heads the Genometrics Section.

Joan Bailey-Wilson is married to Alexander F. Wilson. They met as undergraduates while working with the sole genetics faculty member at Western Maryland College in Westminster, Maryland. Both attended graduate school together at Indiana University, where they studied medical genetics, mathematics, and computer science.

They were married in 1978, and two years later they received their doctorates and went to Louisiana State University Medical School in New Orleans to work with Robert Elston. a leading statistical geneticist. Joan and Alexander entered LSU as postdoctoral fellows and stayed for 15 years, each ultimately reaching the rank of full professor. When Elston left Louisiana State University for Case Western Reserve University in Cleveland in 1995, Wilson and Bailey-Wilson decided to relocate as well, to NHGRI.

Initially they were in separate branches—Wilson in the Genetic Disease Research Branch led by Robert Nussbaum and Bailey-Wilson in the Medical Genetics Branch led at the time by Clair Francomano. However, their work was so different from that of the other more traditional bench scientists in their branches that they posed an administrative challenge.

"We don't purchase supplies; we make contracts for data collection. When we buy computers, it's not laptop computers, it's big servers," explained Wilson.

So two years later, Wilson and Bailey-Wilson became a branch unto themselves—the Inherited Disease Research Branch (IDRB). Because NIH's anti-nepotism rules prohibit one spouse from supervising the other, Nussbaum was appointed acting chief of the branch. Over the years, Nussbaum gradually taught Wilson and Bailey-Wilson the administrative aspects of the chief's job; thus, they were well prepared to take over this year. "He trained us up," said Wilson. Co-branch chiefs are rare at the NIH; married co-chiefs are even rarer.

Bailey-Wilson and Wilson have 2 children.
