= Amita Manatunga =

Sri Lankan biostatistician

Amita Kalyanie Manatunga is a Sri Lankan biostatistician who works as a professor of biostatistics and bioinformatics at the Rollins School of Public Health, Emory University, where she is also affiliated with the Winship Cancer Institute. Her research interests include survival analysis, inter-rater reliability, environmental epidemiology, and medical imaging of the kidneys.

== Education and career ==
Manatunga graduated from the University of Colombo in Sri Lanka with first class honors in 1978. She has master's degrees in statistics from Purdue University (1984) and the University of Rochester (1986). She completed her Ph.D. at the University of Rochester in 1990. Her dissertation, Inference for Multivariate Survival Distributions Generated by Stable Frailties, was supervised by David Oakes.

After finishing her doctorate, she joined the faculty at Indiana University as an assistant professor, and moved in 1994 to Emory. At Emory, she is a long-term and frequent collaborator with two other women in biostatistics, Limin Peng and her former student Ying Guo.

== Recognition ==
Manatunga was elected as a Fellow of the American Statistical Association in 2004.
