= Ying Guo =

Chinese biostatistician

Ying Guo is a Chinese biostatistician specializing in biomedical imaging, neuroimaging, and high-dimensional data analysis. She is a professor of biostatistics and bioinformatics at Emory University, where she directs the Emory Center for Biomedical Imaging Statistics(CBIS).

== Education and career ==
Guo graduated from Renmin University of China in 1998 and earned a Master's in statistics in 2000. She completed her Ph.D. in biostatistics at Emory University in 2004. Her dissertation, Assessing Agreement for Survival Outcomes, was supervised by Amita Manatunga.

After continuing to work at Emory as a research assistant professor, she was offered a tenure-track position in 2006. Later, in 2014, she became acting director of the Center for Biomedical Imaging Statistics in 2014 and director in 2016. She became a full professor at Emory in 2019. At Emory, Guo has maintained longstanding and active collaborations with two other female biostatisticians Amita Manatunga and Limin Peng. Guo’s research develops advanced statistical methods for complex biomedical data, with a focus on brain function, Connectome, mental health, and neurodevelopment, and translates these innovations into impactful public health applications.

== Recognition ==
Guo was the president of the Georgia chapter of the American Statistical Association for 2017–2018. In 2018, she was elected as a Fellow of the American Statistical Association. She was also the elected chair of the ASA Statistics in Imaging program in 2021.. She received the Michael H. Kutner Distinguished Alumni Award in 2023.
