= María del Pilar Díaz =

Argentine statistician

- Education: University of São Paulo
- Scientific career
- Fields: Statistics

María del Pilar Díaz is an Argentine statistician. She is a professor of statistics in the Faculty of Economics at the National University of Córdoba (UNC). Pilar Díaz was an instructor in the Department of Statistics and Biostatistics in the School of Nutrition in the Faculty of Medical Sciences at UNC in 1983.

Pilar Díaz completed a bachelor's degree in mathematics at UNC. She earned a master's degree (in 1992) and doctorate in statistics (in 1996) at the University of São Paulo.
