= Sylvia Esterby =

Canadian environmental statistician

Sylvia Rose Esterby is a Canadian environmental statistician known for her research on water quality. She is an associate professor emeritus at the University of British Columbia (Okanagan Campus), a founder of the International Environmetrics Society, an elected member of the International Statistical Institute, and a Fellow of the American Statistical Association.

== Education and career ==
Esterby obtained her Ph.D. in 1976 from the University of Waterloo. Her dissertation was The Role of Environmental Lead in Human Disease Processes, supervised by W. F. Forbes. She joined the University of British Columbia in 2000, after previously working as a researcher at the National Water Research Institute of Environment Canada in Burlington, Ontario.

== Service ==
Esterby became a founding member of the board of directors of the International Environmetrics Society in 1989, and drafted the constitution of the society. She was president of the society in 2001. Since 2008 the society has been an official section of the International Statistical Institute.

She served as the president of the Biostatistics Section of the Statistical Society of Canada for 1995–1996.

== Recognition ==
Esterby is an elected member of the International Statistical Institute. She was elected as a Fellow of the American Statistical Association in 2013. In the same year the International Environmetrics Society gave her their Distinguished Service Award "in grateful recognition of passionate and pioneering leadership in developing and promoting environmental and ecological statistics, and of active, professional service throughout the lifetime of The International Environmetrics Society (TIES), including being a Member of the TIES Founding Board of Directors." The Sylvia Esterby Presentation Award of the International Environmetrics Society was established in her name in 2018.
