= Johannes Fallati =

German statistician and economist (1809–1855)

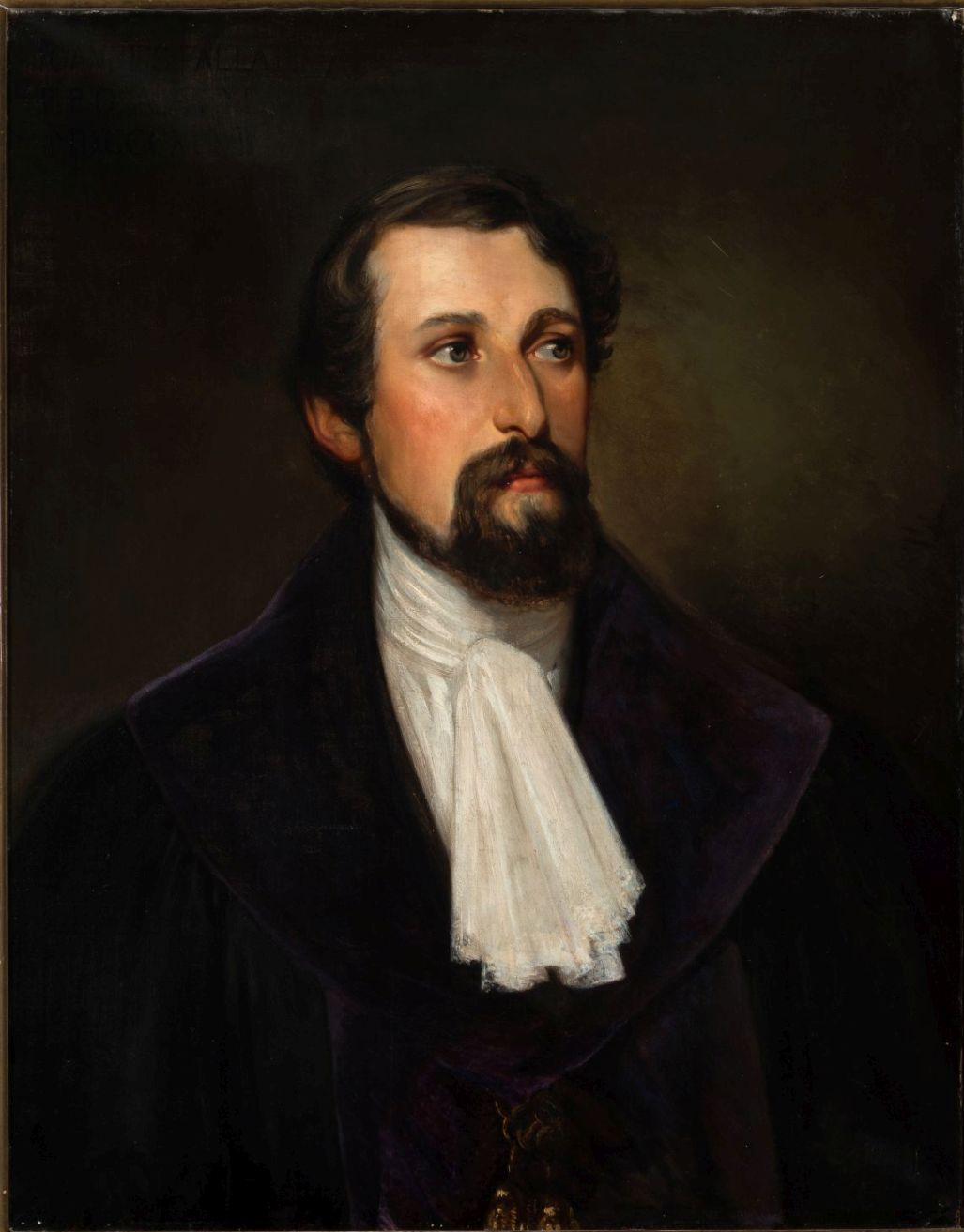
Johannes Fallati.

Johannes Baptista Fallati (15 March 1809 – 5 October 1855) was a German statistician and economist.

== Life and career ==
Fallati was born at Hamburg, where his father, originally of Rovigo (Venetia), was a merchant.

Fallati was educated at the University of Tübingen and Heidelberg University, and in 1838 became professor of political history and statistics at the University of Tübingen. In 1839 he travelled to England, inquiring into English statistical societies and other institutions. In 1848 he became a member of the Württemberg parliament, and under-secretary for commerce in the short-lived Frankfurt imperial assembly, 1848–49. On its dissolution he returned to an academic career, becoming in 1850 university librarian at Tübingen.

From 1844 till his death, Fallati was joint-editor of the quarterly Zeitschrift fur die gesammte Staatswissenschaft. During his brief political career he planned and embodied legislative organisation in four directions, viz. the imperial consulate, inland navigation, marine measurement, and his most cherished idea an imperial statistical bureau. He also prosecuted inquiry in the question of emigration. To a winning personality and many-sided culture he united clear and practical method. He died of cholera in The Hague.

== Works, economic and statistical ==
- Die Statistischen Vereine der Englander, Tübingen, 1840.
- Ueber die sogenannte materielle Tendenz der Gegenwart, Tübingen, 1842.
- Einleitung in die Wissenschaft der Statistik Tübingen, 1843.
- In the Deutsche Vierteljahrsschrift " Ueber die Haupterscheinungsformen der Sucht, schnell und muhelos reichtzuuwerden, im Gegensatze des Mittel-alters und der neueren Zeit", 1840. 3tes Heft.
- In the Zeitschrift f. Staatsw. : on Social Origins, i. (1844);
- on Association as a Moral Force, i. (1844)
- on English Working Men's Clubs and Institutes; on Free Trade in Land; and on German Blue Books, ii. (1845);
- on Agriculture and Technology at the Congresses of Italian Scientists, iii. iv. (1846–47);
- on Progress in Practical Statistics; and on 'knodes of Statistical Inquiry in England, France, and Belgium, iii.;
- on Dearth and Famine Policy in Belgium; Belgian Excise; Belgian Census; Statistics in Sicily, Denmark, and Schleswig-Holstein; and Socialism and Communism, iv.;
- on Statistics at the Lübeck Germanist (Philoteuton) Conference, v. (1848);
- on the Evolution of Law in Savage and Barbarous Tribes;
- a proposed Inland Navigation Law; and Administrative Statistics in Germany, vii, (1850);
- on Trade Combinations in France, viii. (1851);
- on Statistics of Area and Population in British India; and Administrative Statistics in Norway, ix. (1852);
- on the Statistical Congress at Brussels, ix. (1853).
