= Selma Fine Goldsmith =

American economic statistician

Selma Evelyn Fine Goldsmith (1912–1962) was an American economic statistician who accurately estimated the personal income distribution of Americans.

== Life ==
Selma Fine was born in New York City on January 17, 1912, and attended Morris High School in The Bronx. She graduated in 1932 from Cornell University and completed her doctorate in 1936 from Harvard University with a dissertation on 17th- and 18th-century British business cycles.

Fine began working for the United States Department of Agriculture and then for the National Resources Planning Board, where she began working on income tax data. During this time she married Yale economist Raymond W. Goldsmith. They had three children. Her major publications on income data were produced later, in the 1950s.

She died of cancer on April 15, 1962.

=== Personal life ===
Fine was married to Raymond W. Goldsmith, Professor of Economics at Yale University.

== Recognition ==
Goldsmith won the Distinguished Service Award of the Department of Commerce in 1955, and a Rockefeller public service award in 1956. In 1962, she was elected as a Fellow of the American Statistical Association for "numerous definitive studies clarifying the complex relationships among the statistics relating to the distribution of family income, family expenditures, and the national income accounts".

== Published works ==
- 1939. "The Use of Income Tax Data in the National Resources Committee Estimate of the Distribution of Income by Size," (with Enid Baird), Studies in Income and Wealth 3.
- 1950. "Statistical Information on the Distribution of Income by Size," American Economic Review 40.
- 1951. "Appraisal of Basic Data Available for Constructing Income Size Distributions," Studies in Income and Wealth 13.
- 1953. "Income Distribution in the United States by Size, 1944–50," (with George Jaszi), Supplement to the Survey of Current Business.
- 1954. "Size Distribution of Income Since the Mid-Thirties," (with George Jaszi, Hyman Kaitz, and Maurice Liebenberg), Review of Economics and Statistics 34.
- 1954. "Inequality of Income Distribution—Discussion," American Economic Review 44.
- 1956. "Reply to Dr. Clyman," Review of Economics and Statistics 38.
- 1957. "Changes in the Size Distribution of Income," American Economic Review 47.
- 1958. "Size Distribution of Personal Income," Survey of Current Business 38.
- 1958. "The Relation of Census Income Distribution Statistics to Other Income Data, An Appraisal of the 1950 Census Income Data," Studies in Income and Wealth 23.
- 1960. "Size Distribution of Income and Wealth in the United States," in Arndt, Helmut (ed.), Die Konzentration in der Wirtschaft.
- 1962. "Low-Income Families and Measures of Income Inequality," Review of Social Economy 20.
