= Howell Tong =

Chinese/British statistician (born 1944)

- 湯家豪
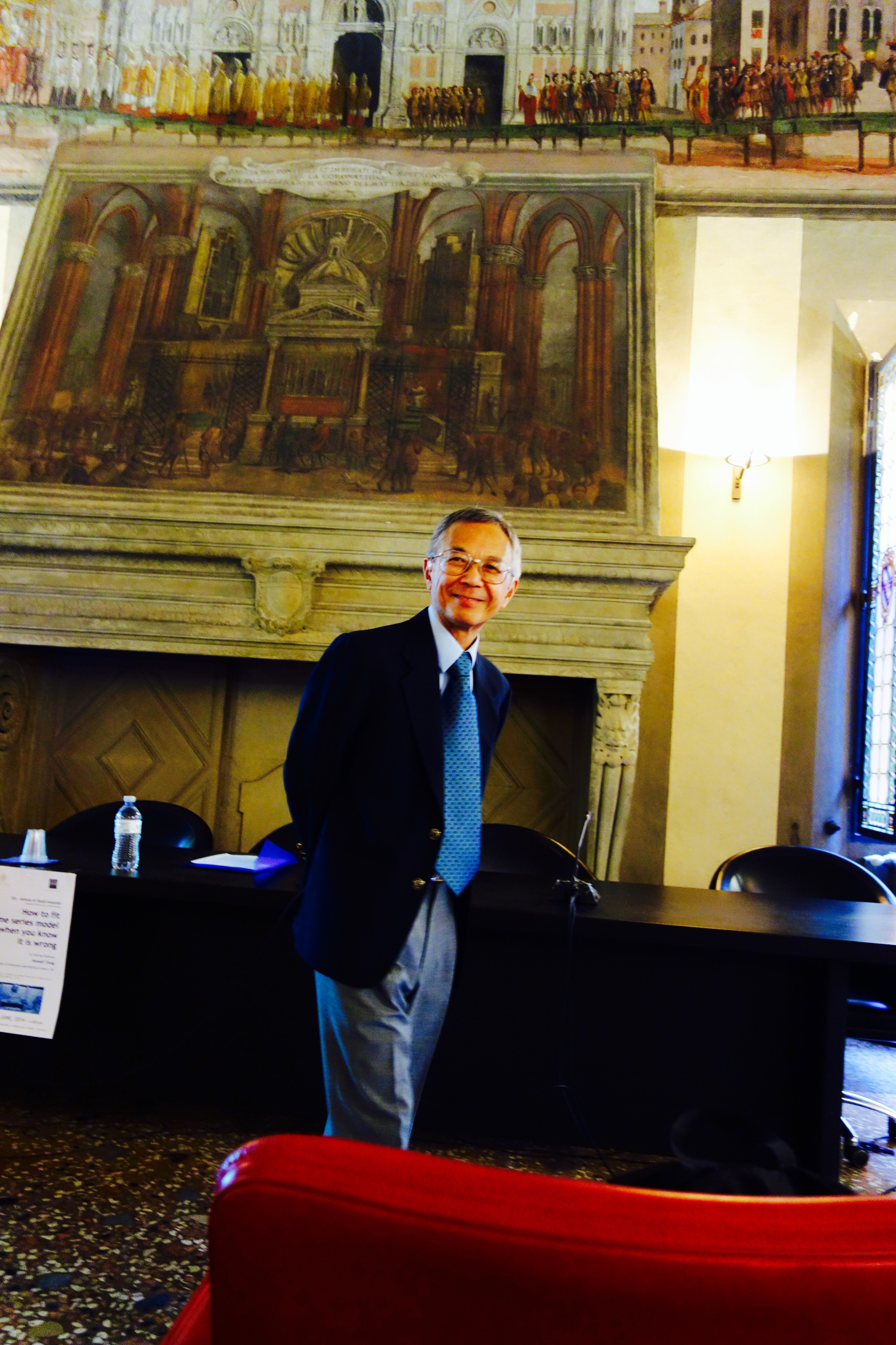
- Born: 1944 (age 81–82); Hong Kong
- Education: University of Manchester
- Known for: Threshold Principle; Threshold models; nonlinear time series; nonstationary time series; gradient-based entropy; chaos; dimension reduction; model selection; likelihood-free statistics; Markov chain modeling; reliability
- Awards: Foreign Member of Norwegian Academy of Science and Letters (Mathematics Section); Guy Medal in Silver, Royal Statistical Society, U.K. National Natural Science Award (Class II), China; Honorary Fellow of the Institute and Faulty of Actuaries, U.K. Elected Member of Academy of Europe; Distinguished Achievement Award, International Chinese Statistical Association
- Scientific career
- Fields: Statistics
- Workplaces: Northern Polytechnic London (1967-68); University of Manchester Institute of Science and Technology (1968–82); Chinese University of Hong Kong (1982–85); University of Kent (1986–99); University of Hong Kong (1997–2004); London School of Economics (1999–2009); Academy of Mathematics and System Sciences, the Chinese Academy of Sciences (2000-2004); University of Electronic Science and Technology of China, China (2016–2021); Tsinghua University, China (2019-now); Xiamen University, China (2025-now)

Howell Tong (simplified Chinese: 汤家豪; traditional Chinese: 湯家豪; pinyin: Tāng Jiāháo; born in 1944 in Hong Kong) is a statistician who has pioneered the field of nonlinear time series analysis and made fundamental contributions to semi-parametric statistics, non-parametric statistics, dimension reduction, model selection, likelihood-free statistics, gradient-based entropy, information geometry and other areas. Commenting on Howell Tong's contributions to nonlinear time series analysis, Professor Peter Whittle (FRS) said,"The striking feature of Howell Tong's … is the continuing freshness, boldness and spirit of enquiry which inform them-indeed, proper qualities for an explorer. He stands as the recognised innovator and authority in his subject, while remaining disarmingly direct and enthusiastic." His work, in the words of Sir David Cox (FRS), "links two fascinating fields, nonlinear time series and deterministic dynamical systems." His Threshold Principle, a paradigm shift, allows the analysis of a complex stochastic system by decomposing it into simpler subsystems. He is the father of the threshold time series models, which have extensive applications in ecology, economics, epidemiology, finance and others. (See external links for detail.) Besides nonlinear time series analysis, he was the co-author of another seminal paper, which became the fifth paper that he read to the Royal Statistical Society. This paper on dimension reduction in semi-parametric statistics pioneered the approach based on minimum average variance estimation, which has become one of the primary tools in the field. He has also made numerous novel contributions to nonparametric statistics (obtaining the surprising result that cross-validation does not suffer from the curse of dimensionality for consistent estimation of the embedding dimension of a dynamical system), gradient-based entropy (covering both normalized and non-normalized probability densities, beyond the Shannon entropy), Markov chain modelling (with application to weather data), reliability, non-stationary time series analysis (in both the frequency domain and the time domain) and wavelets.

== Life ==
Born grossly underweight in 1944 in Hong Kong during the Japanese occupation, Howell, with his parents, managed to survive the war years. After the victory over Japan, Howell received his early education in and around Hong Kong until 1961, when, as a scholarship boy, he left Hong Kong Wah Yan College 香港華仁書院 (founded by the Irish Jesuits in 1919); he was sent by his father (a waiter at a Chinese restaurant) to join him in London, UK. Howell completed his matriculation at the Barnsbury School for Boys in North London (one of the earliest comprehensive schools in England staffed by mathematics teachers without a bachelar degree in the subject; later merged with Highbury Grammar School). He, the first boy from that school who went to a university, was awarded a Bachelor of Science degree (with first class honours in Mathematics) by the University of Manchester Institute of Science and Technology (UMIST, now merged into the University of Manchester) in 1966. After graduation, he pursued his initial interest in Algebra, under the mentorship of Professor Kurt August Hirsch, with a research studentship at Queen Mary College, London. However, he quickly discovered probability theory and statistics more to his liking and left QMC after one year. He then spent a year teaching at the Northern Polytechnic, London, before returning to UMIST. At UMIST, he gained a Master of Science degree (top of class) in 1969 and a Doctor of Philosophy (supervised by Maurice Priestley) in 1972. He was appointed demonstrator at UMIST in 1968, and remained at UMIST from 1968 to 1982, rising through the ranks, from a lectureship to a senior lectureship. While in Manchester, he started his married life with Mary Leong. In 1982, he moved to the Chinese University of Hong Kong as the founding chair of statistics. He was later succeeded by Professors Wing Hung Wong, Jianqing Fan and others. Four years later, he returned to England to be chair professor of statistics (and sometime director of the Institute of Mathematics and Statistics; he was instrumental in having Statistics added to the name) at the University of Kent at Canterbury, a post he held until 1999 (1997-1999 on leave of absence to Hong Kong University). He was the first ethnic Chinese to hold such a chair professorship in the UK, thus opening the door for other ethnic Chinese statisticians. At UKC, under his leadership, the statistics section grew from 6 academic members to more than 20. Part of the success was due to securement of external fundings. For example, he secured donations from Pfizer UK to fund a chair professorship in medical statistics. Whilst on sabbatical leave from UKC to HKU, he was head-hunted in 1999 by the London School of Economics and Political Science, under Director Professor (now Lord) Tony Giddens. From September 1999 to September 2009, he was chair professor of statistics and founded the Centre for the Analysis of Time Series at LSE. Between 1999 and 2004, he alternated between LSE and HKU, by mutual agreement between the two institutions. During this alternating period, Tong was distinguished visiting professor and later chair professor of statistics, founding dean of the graduate school and pro-vice chancellor (equivalent to vice-president), University of Hong Kong, with responsibilities that included overseeing research performance of the university, reformation of university governance and various investigation committees.

Howell retired from LSE on October 1, 2009, and has been an emeritus professor since then. In retirement, he was twice (2009, 2010) holder of the Saw Swee Hock Professorship of Statistics at the National University of Singapore. He was a guest professor, Academy of Mathematics and System Sciences, the Chinese Academy of Sciences from 2000 to 2004, a distinguished visiting professor of statistics at the University of Hong Kong from 2005 to 2013, and a distinguished professor-at-large, University of Electronic Science & Technology of China from 2016–2021. He has been holding a distinguished visiting professorship, Tsinghua University, China, since 2019 (the sole holder till 2025), and one of three Gregory Chow distinguished visiting professors (the other two being econometricians: Professors Whitney Newey and Cheng Hsiao), Xiamen University, China, since 2025.

Tong was elected a member of the International Statistical Institute in 1983. In 1986, he was the session organizer and an invited speaker of the session on time series analysis, at the Inaugural World Congress of the Bernoulli Society, held at Tashkent in the former Soviet Union. He was elected a Fellow of the Institute of Mathematical Statistics in 1993. In 1994, he was the Special Plenary Lecturer (delivering 5 lectures-an account was published as a discussion paper in the Scandinavian Journal of Statistics in 1995) at the 15th Nordic Meeting in Mathematical Statistics, held at Lund, Sweden. In 1999, he delivered the Alan T. Craig lecture at the University of Iowa, USA, and elected an Honorary Fellow of the Institute of Actuaries, England. In 2000, he was the first ethnic Chinese elected a Foreign Member of the Norwegian Academy of Science and Letters and the sole ethnic Chinese in Group 1 Mathematical Subjects of The Mathematical-Natural Science Class as of 2025. In the same year, he became the first statistician to receive the National Natural Science Award in China, as a solo winner and the only winner in the Mathematics Section; (altogether there were 15 class II awardees under the new regulations started in 2000; no class I award was given in 2000). In 2002, the University of Hong Kong gave him their then-highest award, the Distinguished Research Achievement Award, carrying with it a research grant of HK$1,000,000 per annum for three years. In 2007, the Royal Statistical Society, UK, awarded him their Guy Medal in Silver in recognition of his "...many important contributions to time series analysis over a distinguished career and in particular for his fundamental and highly influential paper "Threshold autoregression, limit cycles and cyclical data", read to the society in 1980, which paved the way for a major body of work in non-linear time series modelling." He was the first ethnic Chinese to receive the medal. In 2011, he delivered the Paolu Hsu lecture at the Peking University, China. In 2012, the International Chinese Statistical Association awarded him the Distinguished Achievement Award. In 2014, he held a senior fellowship at the Institute of Advanced Studies, University of Bologna, Italy. In 2026, he was the first statistician of Chinese ethnicity who was elected member of the Academy of Europe (Academia Europaea).

He served the Royal Statistical Society, UK (associate editor, honours committee), the Bernoulli Society (Chairman of the European Section), the Hong Kong Statistical Society (president) and others in various capacities.

Tong has one son (Simon), one daughter (Anna) and three grandchildren.

== Bibliography ==
1. Tong, H. (1983). Threshold Models in Non-linear Time Series Analysis. Springer Verlag. ISBN 0-387-90918-4.
2. Tong, H. (1990). Non-linear Time Series: A Dynamical System Approach. Oxford University Press. ISBN 0-19-852224-X.
3. Chan, K.S.; Tong, H. (2001). Chaos: a statistical perspective. Springer Verlag.
4. Tong, Howell (2001). "A Personal journey through time series in Biometrika". Biometrika. 88 (Biometrika Centenary): 195–218. doi:10.1093/biomet/88.1.195.
5. Tong, Howell (2001). "A Personal journey through time series in Biometrika". In D. M. Titterington and D. R. Cox (ed.). Biometrika: One Hundred Years. Oxford University Press. pp. 193–216. ISBN 0-19-850993-6.
