= Naomi B. Robbins =

American statistician

- Born: Naomi Bograd; May 8, 1937 (age 89)
- Education: Bryn Mawr College; Cornell University (MA); Columbia University (PhD)
- Occupation: Statistician
- Spouse: Edward Robbins (m. 1962)
- Children: 2

Naomi Robbins (née Bograd), also known by her initials NBR, is an American statistician, expert in data visualization, graphical data presentation consultant and author. She is the author of Creating More Effective Graphs, a reference book on the graphical representation of data.

== Education, early life and career ==
Naomi Bograd was born to Samuel Bograd and his wife.

Robbins did her undergraduate studies at Bryn Mawr College, and graduated in 1958 with honors in mathematics. By 1961, when she joined the Institute of Mathematical Statistics, she was already a member of the technical staff of Bell Labs. In 1962, she earned a master's degree from Cornell University with a thesis On a sequential process inspection scheme with an application to a detection problem. She later received a teaching assistantship at Cornell. Robbins completed her studies with a Ph.D. from Columbia University in 1971. Her dissertation was Some characteristics of Page's procedures for detecting a change in a location parameter. She continued to work for many years at Bell Labs in Whippany, New Jersey before going into private practice as a statistical consultant.

Robbins also served as the 2015 chair of the Section on Statistical Graphics of the American Statistical Association. In 2016, she was elected as a Fellow of the American Statistical Association.

== Personal life ==
In 1962, she married Edward L. Robbins, an optometrist, originally from Jersey City, New Jersey. They have two kids, Joyce and Richard.
