= Zhang Zhaohuan =

Chinese physician (1925–2005)

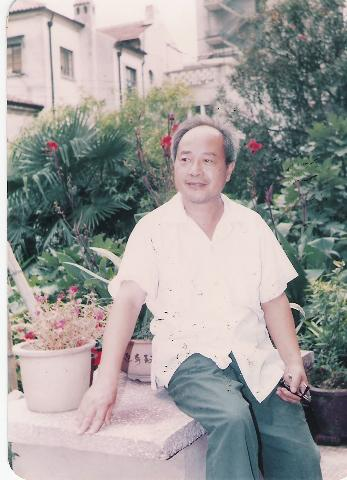

Zhang Zhaohuan (张照寰, 1925–2005) was a Chinese physician and biostatistician.

== Early life ==
Born in Zhenjiang in 1925, he graduated from the Faculty of Medicine, Shanghai Medical College in 1950. Because of his outstanding school performance and academic potential, he was offered a lectureship by his alma mater upon graduation—a practice that is still in vogue in almost all universities in China when recruiting exceptional faculty members is difficult In the eight years that followed, he worked there first as a lecturer and then an associate professor and associate director.

== Career ==
Zhang was among the few doctors in China who saw the value of disease prevention. As a new medical graduate, he advocated passionately that disease prevention rather than treatment was more effective. Prevention should be a primary strategy in controlling the spread of infectious diseases and improving the overall health of the general population of China. He devoted his entire career to this conviction through research and teaching. He was one of the founders of the Department of Health (now known as School of Public Health) at Shanghai Medical College. He was a revered scholar, a pioneer researcher in health statistics and biostatistics in China, and a public health practitioner.

In the height of the so-called "Great Leap Forward" era in 1958, an institutionalized frenzy with an ostensible yet unrealistic aim to overtake Britain in economic output, he was dispatched to the then newly established Chongqing Medical School (重庆医学院, currently Chongqing Medical University) to establish a new academic department, the Department of Preventive Medicine. He has been regarded as the founder ever since. During his over-20-year tenure as an associate professor and chairman of that department, his accomplishments in teaching and research had been well recognized.

From 1979 until his retirement after he returned to Shanghai Medical University, he had been a full professor of medical statistics, vice chairman in the Department of Health Statistics and Social Medicine. At a time when biostatistics received little, if any, attention in the medical field, he was prescient to foresee its important roles in medical research and contended that vigorous research design and statistical analysis were an indispensable part of good medical research. Despite his lack of formal mathematical and statistical training, he taught himself sophisticated statistical theories and became skillful and creative in applying biostatistics to biomedical problems. He was among the first few investigators who, in working with his students, introduced advanced biostatistical methods from western countries to China. A few examples include: multiple linear regression, logistic regression, Cox regression, proportional hazards models, multi-stage survival model, structural equation modeling, generalized linear model, and epidemic model, which are now widely used by epidemiologists and other medical researchers in China. Considering China's precarious political atmosphere, when the nation was heavily ravaged by seemingly incessant political turmoils, these accomplishments were quite a feat.

At Shanghai Medical University, he designed, introduced, and lectured many courses for medical students including "Introduction to Biostatistics" and "Clinical Trials", "Design of Experiments" and "Multivariate Analysis" to graduate students in public health, and "Quality Control" to students in health administration. He was an educator with the ability to tailor esoteric statistical materials according to students' background and needs.

During his almost near half-century academic career, Professor Zhang received numerous awards and held many positions including director for the Division of Medical Statistics and Social Medicine in the Institute of Preventive Medicine of Shanghai Medical University, panel member for professional evaluation board for Shanghai Medical University, and School of Public Health, member of the national education, a board member for reviewing teaching material for School of Public Health. In 1983, he was sent by Ministry of Health to Austria, Yugoslavia and Sweden as a visiting scholar to further broaden his research and promote international collaborations.

Besides his recognized excellence and contributions in biostatistics, his research interests also included other broadly defined areas of preventive medicine and public health. The research projects he led, and the scientific publications he produced, were also in occupational epidemiology, women and children's health, geriatrics, infectious diseases such as measles and tuberculosis. He published more than 300 scientific papers and textbooks, many of which were highly regarded and are still in use in China.

Zhang supervised many graduate students at Master or Ph.D level, who now work in universities, government agencies, and pharmaceutical companies in the United States, Canada, England, Australia and China.

Zhang’s passion in research and teaching did not end with his retirement in 1991. Instead, he continued supervising graduate students, providing consultation service to various institutions across China, and collaborating in a number of research projects. He earned his reputation and respect by his dedication and scholarly distinction.

== Personal life and death ==
Zhang died in 2005. He was by his wife, Cao Huizhu (曹惠珠), who worked at Shanghai Medical College. She died on August 12, 2020.

== MSc/PhD projects ==
Mathematical epidemic models and their applications in the spread of tuberculosis, 1983

Logistic regression model, 1984

Cox regression model, 1985

Path analysis of nuclear family data, 1988

Proportional hazard model, 1988

Loglinear model, 1989

Multi-state model, 1991

== Selected publications ==
- 王海云, 张照寰. 5种常用避孕方法的使用效果分析. 《中国妇幼保健》 1996年第06期
- 李其松, 曹素华, 谢国民, 干玉红, 马鸿建, 陆继珍, 张照寰. Relieving effects of Chinese herbs, ear-acupuncture and epidural morphing on postoperative pain in liver cancer. 《Chinese Medical Journal》 1994年04期
- 金丕焕, 詹绍康, 张照寰. 《医用统计方法》 上海医科大学出版社，1992
- 庄莹, 彭文彬, 易企龙, 吴钢, 唐占坤, 吴润琴, 张照寰. 预测乡镇企业矽肺的发病趋势. 《环境与职业医学》 1992年03期
- 陈景龙, 王德耀, 沈淑军, 陆华, 李言, 张照寰. 城镇居民卫生知识及其健康教育形式需求研究. 《中国农村卫生事业管理》 1992年第11期
- Fan Z, Tang ZY, Liu KD, Yi QL, Zhang ZH. Factors influencing the effect of radioimmunotherapy on liver cancer. Chinese Journal of Cancer Research 4(2):55-60, 1992, https://doi.org/10.1007%2FBF02997511
- 钱文娣, 张照寰, 黄建权, 王静龙. 威布尔回归模型应用于石棉肺资料分析. 《应用概率统计》 1992年01期
- 易企龙, 钱文娣, 张照寰. 蒋氏生存模型及其在剂量反应关系分析中的应用. 《应用概率统计》 1991年01期
- 崔济生, 张照寰. 多级正态变换方法及其在医学上的应用. 《中华预防医学杂志》 第6期:364-366, 1992年
- 刘玉秀, 张照寰. Freireich 白血病临床试验数据作为生存分析方法的通用实例分析。《中国卫生统计》 8（6）：47-50， 1991
- 易企龙, 张照寰. 尘肺病人预后分析的多状态模型. 《上海医科大学学报》 第4期: 298-303, 1991
- 王德耀, 张照寰, 蔡延平, 郑平, 叶喜福, 汤友梅. 上海县村级PHC支持体系发展状况调查. 《中国初级卫生保健》 1991年01期
- 崔济生, 张照寰. 国外参照值概念的发展及制定参照值区间的统计方法. 《中国卫生统计》 第2期:55-58, 1991
- 张照寰, 冯学山. Poisson分布变量多组样本比较的统计方法. 《上海医科大学学报》 第3期:233-236, 1990
- 蒋绪亮, 张仲平, 张倩, 胡玉兰, 王笏臣, 张照寰, 施宜平. 铅中毒发病与铅烟(尘)浓度关系的调查研究. 《工业卫生与职业病》 1990年06期
- 严云屏, 施守义, 施宜平, 张照寰, 潘德济. 雷公藤红素外用治疗类风湿性关节炎局部肿痛. 《中国新药与临床杂志》 1989年06期
- 易企龙, 张照寰, 胡天锡, 陆志英. 矽患肺者预后的评价指标. 《环境与职业医学》 1989年01期
- 张照寰, 薛寿征. 《灾难性环境事故》 上海医科大学出版社, 1988 ISBN 9787562700043/7562700044
- 俞顺章, 赵乐平, 陆瑞芳, 张照寰. 上海市乳腺癌流行因素的多变量分析. 《复旦学报(医学版)》 1988年01期
- 施宜平, 张照寰, 江源青. 成组序贯试验设计和分析方法. 《复旦学报(医学版)》 1988年06期
- 张照寰, 王德耀, 李德, 巢利民, 叶喜福, 汤友梅, 钱遂一, 朱文俊, 宋凤梅. 农村卫生保健员中级进修教育. 《复旦学报(医学版)》 1987年S1期
- 赵乐平, 叶展, 张照寰, 俞顺章, 彭国华. 随访的临床试验观察对象数的估计. 《中国卫生统计》 1986年01期
- 赵乐平, 许世谨, 张照寰, 俞顺章. 最优估计Logistic回归模型的参数及临床应用. 《运筹学杂志》 1986年02期
- Shi YQ, Guo SW, Zhang ZH. A prognostic multifactorial analysis of neuroblastoma. (In Chinese) Acta Academiae Medicinae Primae Shanghai 12:51-56, 1985.
- 张照寰. 生存率用作居民健康状况指标. 《复旦学报(医学版)》 1985年05期
- 郭孙伟, 张照寰, 许世瑾, 沈福民. Cox回归模型及其在医学中的应用. 《复旦学报(医学版)》 1985年04期
- 赵乐平, 张照寰, 俞顺章. 最佳估计肿瘤流行病调查的样本大小. 《肿瘤》 1985年04期
- 张照寰, 陆培廉, 施寿康. 粉尘接触量与发病关系统计方法. 《中国预防医学杂志》 18(1):7, 1984
- 蒋迪仙, 黄佩文, 张照寰, 周毓菁. 低出生体重儿发生因素的调查. 《复旦学报(医学版)》 1983年02期
- 张照寰. 相对危险度与归属危险度. 《工业卫生与职业病》 1981年04期
- 张逢春, 蓝长安, 陈德祥, 王德珍, 周燕荣, 张照寰. 精神分裂症的季节性(附2,115例分析). 《中国神经精神疾病杂志》 1981年05期
- 刘元福, 张照寰, 杜剑云, 周燕荣, 王昌玲, 张如玉, 王家荣, 邓开德, 李世英, 董东. 机床工人振动病调查研究. 《工业卫生与职业病》 1980年S1期
- 张照寰, 周燕荣, 张如玉, 张克随. 正常儿童X线胸片心脏投影面积测量. 《重庆医学》 1979年04期
