= Elżbieta Pleszczyńska =

Polish statistician

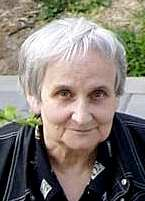
- Pronunciation
- Born: 20 March 1933 (age 92); Wola Wydrzyna

Elżbieta Pleszczyńska (born 20 March 1933) is a Polish full professor of statistics and an activist of disability rights movement.

== Biography ==
She gained an M.Sc. in mathematics at University of Warsaw, Faculty of Mathematics, Physics and Chemistry in 1956. She held position at Institute of Mathematics PAS until 1972. She received her Ph.D. in 1965 in the area of discriminant analysis ("Power of Test, and Separability of Hypothesis in Statistical Design of Experiments"). Her habilitation thesis, titled "Trend Estimation Problems in Time Series Analysis", was accepted in 1973.

From 1967 to 1968, she was a visiting researcher in University of Wales (Great Britain), and from 1971 to 1972, in University of Montreal. In 1973, she moved to the Institute of Computer Science, PAS. In 1977, 1979 and 1989, she was awarded by the Polish Academy of Sciences. In 1981, she visited Italy invited by CNR. In the 1990s, she with her team started the so called grade data analysis, a science of applying copula and rank methods to problems of correspondence and cluster analysis together with outlier detection. The adjective grade here honors statisticians of the first half of the 20th century, who called cumulative distribution functions in this way. In 1993, the President of the Republic of Poland Lech Wałęsa awarded Elżbieta Pleszczyńska with the Full Professor title in the area of mathematics. In 2000, she was an invited consultant of the Cambridge University.

In the Institute of Computer Science PAS, she had been leader of the Statistical Data Analysis division for many years. According to the Polish law, professors in PAS must retire at the age of 70. Her retirement in 2003, although a bit confusing, did not stop her scientific and social activity.

=== Scientific views ===
Prof. Pleszczyńska is known for her criticism of the classic statistical approach. Classic parametric methods, like Pearson correlation coefficient, or least squares method produce comparable results only for comparable distribution types (in practice multivariate normal distribution is being assumed). Parametric statistical tests are derived from distribution assumptions. Classic methods fail if the input data contain strong outliers, and interpretation of their results should be different for different distribution types. In practice, the underlying assumptions are often not checked, moreover they are always violated – there is no normal distribution in the real world, because every real variable is limited (for example people cannot be –170 cm or +2 km tall), and the normal distribution implies positive probability density for every real number. In most cases the real distribution is skewed or discrete, which does not prevent people from using normal distribution methods. The extent of this violation can be measured, but its maximum accepted level is just a convention, not mathematics. The parametric methods always work out of their conditions of use. However, their results are often considered valid, which leads to "scientific" validation of false hypothesis. For the reasons mentioned above, Elżbieta Pleszczyńska is a strong advocate of explorative data analysis and non-parametric statistics, like Spearman's rho, Kendall's tau, or grade data analysis.

=== Selected works ===
- Kowalczyk, Teresa; Pleszczyńska, Elżbieta; Ruland, Fred (2004). Grade Models and Methods for Data Analysis with Applications for the Analysis of Data Populations. Studies in Fuzziness and Soft Computing. Vol. 151. Berlin Heidelberg New York: Springer Verlag. doi:10.1007/978-3-540-39928-5. ISBN 3-540-21120-9. ISSN 1434-9922.
- Pleszczyńska, Elżbieta; Szczesny, Wiesław (2002). Grade exploratory methods applied to some medical data sets. Vol. 22, 1. Biocybernetics and Biomedical Engineering. pp. 17–30.
- Pleszczyńska, Elżbieta; Szczesny, Wiesław; Grzegorek, Maria (June 2002). "Clustering Respondents in Clinical Databases Using Ordered Grade Clustering". In Bobrowski L.; Doroszewski J.; Victor N. (eds.). Lecture Notes of the ICB Seminars Statistics and Clinical Practice. Warszawa: International Center of Biocybernetics, 64–69.
- Bromek, T. (1991). Pleszczyńska, E. (ed.). Statistical inference. Theory and practice. Warszawa, Kluwer Dordrecht: PWN.

== Social work ==
Elżbieta Pleszczyńska has co-founded Foundation Supporting Physically Disabled Mathematicians and Computer Specialists in Warsaw (September 1990). She has been the Foundation chairman for multiple years.

The Foundation under her leadership was mainly interested in the professional advancement of physically disabled people via technology and remote work.

Pleszczyńska has been continuously focusing attention of the public opinion on rights of disable people, in her periodical reports.

== Private life ==
She had a son, Krzysztof Leski, who was a journalist. Pieszczyńska also had two grandchildren. She lived in Warsaw Wola district. Since July 2019, she was in elderly care.
