= Visman =

Visman ويسمان
- Village
- Location within Iran
- Coordinates: 35°01′54″N 49°51′52″E
- Country: Iran
- Province: Markazi
- County: Saveh
- Bakhsh: Nowbaran
- Rural District: Aq Kahriz

Population (2006)
  - Total: 118
- Time zone: UTC+3:30 (IRST)
  - Summer (DST): UTC+4:30 (IRDT)

Visman (Persian: ويسمان, also Romanized as Vīsmān; also known as Dīsmān and Vishmān) is a village in Aq Kahriz Rural District, Nowbaran District, Saveh County, Markazi Province, Iran. At the 2006 census, its population was 118, in 50 families.
