= Cathy Woan-Shu Chen =

Taiwanese statistician

- Education: University of California, Riverside (master's degree), National Central University (Ph.D)
- Occupation: Statistician
- Employer: Feng Chia University
- Awards: National Science and Technology Council (NSTC) Taiwan Outstanding Research Award (2023)

Cathy Woan-Shu Chen (Chinese: 陳婉淑) is a Taiwanese statistician who works as a distinguished professor of statistics at Feng Chia University. She was formerly editor-in-chief of the Journal of Economics and Management. Her research interests include Bayesian methods and economic statistics.

== Education and career ==
Chen earned a master's degree at the University of California, Riverside, and completed her Ph.D. at National Central University. She joined Feng Chia in 1993, and has been distinguished professor there since 2004. She has also held an adjunct position in the Faculty of Economics at Chiang Mai University since 2007. At Feng Chia, she directed an international degree program in business analytics, the SJSU-FCU Dual Degree Bachelor's Program in Business Analytics, in conjunction with San Jose State University (2016-2018). She was associate dean of International School Technology & Management, Feng Chia University (2018-2020). She has served as co-editor for Computational Statistics since January 2021.

== Recognition ==
In 2016, she was elected as a Fellow of the American Statistical Association. Chen is also a Fellow of the Royal Statistical Society (elected 2009), an elected member of the International Statistical Institute (elected 2008), and a Fellow of the International Society for Bayesian Analysis (elected 2020). She received the National Science and Technology Council (NSTC) Taiwan Outstanding Research Award in 2023.
