= Irène Gijbels =

Mathematical statistician

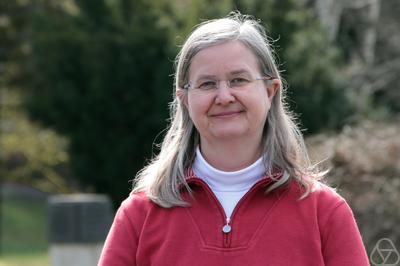
Irène Gijbels

Irène Gijbels is a mathematical statistician at KU Leuven in Belgium, and an expert on nonparametric statistics. She has also collaborated with TopSportLab, a KU Leuven spin-off, on software for risk assessment of sports injuries.

== Education and career ==
Gijbels earned her Ph.D. in 1990 from Limburgs Universitair Centrum. Her dissertation, supervised by Noël Veraverbeke, was Asymptotic Representations under Random Censoring.

She joined KU Leuven after postdoctoral research as a Fulbright scholar at the University of North Carolina at Chapel Hill and the Mathematical Sciences Research Institute.

== Book ==
With Jianqing Fan, Gijbels is the author of Local Polynomial Modelling and Its Applications (CRC Press, 1996).

== Recognition ==
Gijbels is an elected member of the International Statistical Institute and the Royal Flemish Academy of Belgium for Science and the Arts, and a fellow of the American Statistical Association and the Institute of Mathematical Statistics.
