= Veronica Czitrom =

Mexican-American statistician

Veronica A. Czitrom
- Education: University of California, Berkeley; University of Texas at Austin (PhD)
- Scientific career
- Workplaces: National Autonomous University of Mexico; University of Texas at San Antonio; Bell Labs; Chartered Semiconductor Manufacturing
- Thesis: D-Optimal Experimental Designs and Alternative Models for Quadratic Blending with Process Variables (1984)
- Doctoral advisor: Peter William Meredith John

Veronica A. Czitrom (also Anne Veronica Czitrom or Verónica Czitróm de Gerez) is a Mexican-American statistician known for her applications of statistics to the quality control of semiconductor manufacturing.

== Education and career ==
Czitrom is originally from Mexico City. She graduated from the University of California, Berkeley with a bachelor's degree in physics, continued at Berkeley for a master's degree in engineering, and became a professor of systems engineering and applications at the National Autonomous University of Mexico. Subsequently, she returned to graduate study in mathematics and statistics at the University of Texas at Austin. Her 1984 doctoral dissertation, D-Optimal Experimental Designs and Alternative Models for Quadratic Blending with Process Variables, was supervised by Peter William Meredith John.

After completing her doctorate, she became an assistant professor of statistics at the University of Texas at San Antonio. She moved to Bell Labs in 1990, and was seconded from them for two years at SEMATECH. After moving to Chartered Semiconductor Manufacturing in Singapore, in 2003 she founded a statistical consulting firm in Singapore, Statistical Training & Consulting.

She has also served the American Statistical Association as chair of its Quality and Productivity Section, in 2000. Her accomplishments as chair included the establishment of a scholarship in honor of Mary Gibbons Natrella, funding students to travel to the section's annual conference.

== Books ==
With Patrick D. Spagon, Czitrom is the author of the book Statistical Case Studies for Industrial Process Improvement (Society for Industrial and Applied Mathematics, 1997).

She is also the author of four Spanish-language textbooks on engineering: Circuitos y sistemas electro-mecánicos (in two volumes, with Víctor Gerez Greiser, 1974 and 1975), Introducción al análisis de sistemas e investigación de operaciones (with Victor Gerez Greiser, 1978), and Métodos para la solución de problemas con computadora digital : problemas y ejemplos (with José Armando Torres Fentanes, 1980).

== Recognition ==
In 1996, Czitrom was the winner of a Hispanic Engineer National Achievement Award for technical contributions in industry. In 2000, the American Statistical Association honored her as a Fellow of the American Statistical Association.
