= Maurice Priestley =

Statistician (1933–2013)

- Born: 15 March 1933
- Died: 15 June 2013 (aged 80)
- Education: University of Manchester
- Scientific career
- Fields: Statistics
- Workplaces: University of Manchester
- Doctoral advisor: M. S. Bartlett
- Doctoral students: Howell Tong

Maurice Bertram Priestley (15 March 1933 – 15 June 2013) was a professor of statistics in the School of Mathematics, University of Manchester, England. He gained his first degree at the University of Cambridge and went on to gain a Ph.D. from the University of Manchester.

He was known especially for his work on time series analysis, especially spectral analysis and wavelet analysis. He was a longstanding editor of the Journal of Time Series Analysis, a special edition of which was published in his honour in 1993. Less well-known but equally important was his work with M.T. Chao on nonparametric function fitting.

== Selected publications ==
- Priestley, M. B. (1971). "Time-dependent spectral analysis and its application in prediction and control". Journal of Sound and Vibration. 17 (4): 517–534. Bibcode:1971JSV....17..517P. doi:10.1016/0022-460X(71)90064-2.
- Priestley, M. B. (1980). "State-Dependent Models: A General Approach to Non-Linear Time Series Analysis". Journal of Time Series Analysis. 1: 47–71. doi:10.1111/j.1467-9892.1980.tb00300.x.
- Priestley, M. B. (1996). "Wavelets and Time-Dependent Spectral Analysis". Journal of Time Series Analysis. 17: 85–103. doi:10.1111/j.1467-9892.1996.tb00266.x.
- Chao, M. T.; Priestley, M. B. (1972). "Non-parametric function fitting". Journal of the Royal Statistical Society, Series B. 34 (3): 385–392. doi:10.1111/j.2517-6161.1972.tb00916.x.
