= Morgan Grams =

American nephrologist

- Born: Morgan Erika Grams

Academic background
- Education: BS, biology, Yale University; MD, 2005, Columbia University Vagelos College of Physicians and Surgeons; MHS, PhD, Johns Hopkins Bloomberg School of Public Health
- Thesis: Validation of kidney disease outcomes (2013)

Academic work
- Institutions: NYU Langone Health; Johns Hopkins University

Morgan Erika Grams is an American nephrologist. She is the Co-Director of the Division of Precision Medicine, and the Susan and Morris Mark Professor in the Departments of Medicine and Population Health at NYU Langone Health.

== Early life and education ==
Grams completed her Bachelor of Science degree in biology at Yale University and her medical degree at Columbia University Vagelos College of Physicians and Surgeons. She then completed her internal medicine training at the Columbia-Presbyterian Medical Center and her nephrology fellowship, Master of Health Science, and doctoral degree in Epidemiology at Johns Hopkins University.

== Career ==
As an assistant professor of medicine and epidemiology at Johns Hopkins University, Grams led several studies on kidney disease which built evidence that common blood and urine tests for kidney function can be even greater signs and risks of kidney injury than clinical characteristics. Later, Grams developed an online tool to help forecast the long-term risk of kidney failure by weighing a variety of factors and could help identify good candidates to be living kidney donors—including older donors.

During the 2018 academic year, Grams was recognized by the Journal of the American Society of Nephrology as one of their top 5 reviewers. She was later the recipient of the Donald W. Seldin Young Investigator Award from the American Society of Nephrology. Grams was elected to the American Society for Clinical Investigation in 2019. In the same year, she produced a tool to predict whether someone is likely to develop chronic kidney disease within five years. In 2020, Grams was recognized by the American Journal of Kidney Diseases Editors’ Choice Award for her co-authored article Effectiveness of Influenza Vaccination Among Older Adults Across Kidney Function: Pooled Analysis of 2005-2006 Through 2014-2015 Influenza Seasons. She was also promoted to the rank of Full professor, becoming the first woman in 20 years to be promoted to this rank in the Division of Nephrology.

Grams eventually left Johns Hopkins to become the Co-Director of the Division of Precision Medicine, and the Susan and Morris Mark Professor in the Departments of Medicine and Population Health at NYU Langone Health. In 2023, she was appointed Co-Chair Elect of the Kidney Disease: Improving Global Outcomes Committee.
