= Stanislaus S. Uyanto =

Indonesian statistician

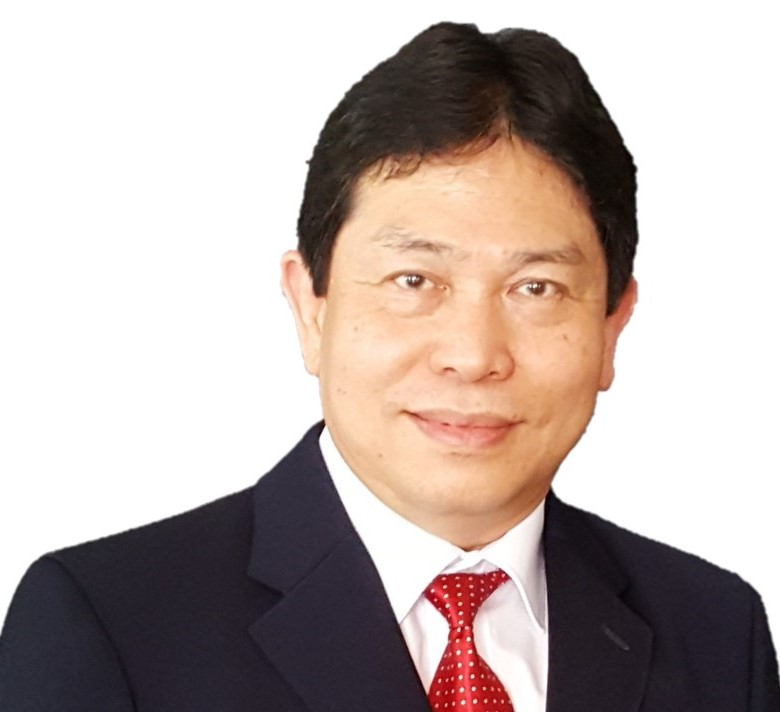
- Education: State University of New York at Albany; State University of New York at Buffalo; University of Melbourne (Ph.D.), Australia
- Scientific career
- Fields: Statistics
- Workplaces: Atma Jaya Catholic University of Indonesia, Jakarta

Stanislaus S. Uyanto is an Indonesian statistician and a professor of statistics at Atma Jaya Catholic University of Indonesia in Jakarta, where he teaches statistics and mathematics.

Stanislaus S. Uyanto graduated from the State University of New York at Albany, where he earned a master's degree in mathematical statistics. He also earned a master's degree in statistics from the State University of New York at Buffalo and holds a Ph.D. in statistics from the School of Mathematics and Statistics at the University of Melbourne, Australia.

He is a member of the International Statistical Institute, the American Statistical Association, and the Institute of Mathematical Statistics.

In 2023, he was honored to serve as an American Statistical Association (ASA) Educational Ambassador.

== Publications ==
=== Books ===
- Uyanto, Stanislaus S. Petunjuk Lengkap Pemrograman Komputer Dengan Bahasa C [A Complete Guide to Programming in C]. Jakarta: Penerbit PT Gramedia Sarana Indonesia (Grasindo). ISBN 979-553-328-2 Catalog entry
- Uyanto, Stanislaus S. Pedoman Analisis Data Dengan SPSS [A Guide to Data Analysis Using SPSS]. Edisi-3. Yogyakarta: Penerbit Graha Ilmu, 2009. ISBN 978-979-756-430-8 Publisher page

== Selected journal articles ==
- Uyanto, Stanislaus S. (2022). An Extensive Comparisons of 50 Univariate Goodness-of-fit Tests for Normality”, Austrian Journal of Statistics, 51(3), 45–97. (https://doi.org/10.17713/ajs.v51i3.1279 )
- Uyanto, Stanislaus S. (2020). "Power Comparisons of Five Most Commonly Used Autocorrelation Tests", Pakistan Journal of Statistics and Operation Research, 16(1), 119-130. (https://doi.org/10.18187/pjsor.v16i1.2691 ).
- Uyanto, Stanislaus S. (2022). "Monte Carlo power comparison of seven most commonly used heteroscedasticity tests", Communications in Statistics - Simulation and Computation, Volume 51, No.4, pp. 2065-2082 (https://doi.org/10.1080/03610918.2019.1692031 ).
- Uyanto, Stanislaus S. (2017). "Coefficient of Relationship for Two Symmetric Alpha-Stable Variables When Alpha in the Interval (1,2]", Communications in Statistics - Theory and Methods, Volume 46, No.14, pp. 6874-6881 (https://dx.doi.org/10.1080/03610926.2015.1137599 ).
