= Joan Hu =

Chinese and Canadian statistician

Xiaoqiong Joan Hu is a Chinese and Canadian statistician. Her research has involved pseudolikelihood, estimating functions, missing data, and varied applications of statistics. She is a professor of statistics at Simon Fraser University.

== Education and career ==
Hu earned a bachelor's degree in mathematics in 1983 and a master's degree in probability and statistics in 1987, both from Peking University. She completed her Ph.D. in 1995 at the University of Waterloo with Jerry Lawless as her doctoral advisor. Her dissertation was Estimation from Truncated Data with Supplementary Information, with Applications to Field Reliability.

After postdoctoral research at Health Canada and the Harvard T.H. Chan School of Public Health, she taught at the University of Memphis from 1998 to 2003, also holding an adjunct position at St. Jude Children's Research Hospital in Memphis. She moved to Simon Fraser University in 2003, and in 2017 added an affiliated position with the University of British Columbia (Okanagan Campus).

== Recognition ==
Hu won the Pierre Robillard Award for 1996 for the best doctoral dissertation in statistics in Canada. In 1998, with Jerry Lawless and Kazuyuki Suzuki, she won the Frank Wilcoxon Prize.

Hu has been an elected member of the International Statistical Institute since 2007. In 2012, the American Statistical Association named Hu as a fellow "for outstanding contributions to statistical methods for incomplete data analysis, statistical monitoring and the analysis of stochastic process data; for excellence in statistical applications in biomedical research and reliability; and for outstanding service to the profession".
