= Jan Visman =

Jan Visman (2 July 1914, in Deventer – 19 February 2006) was a Dutch statistician who played a key role in building a bridge between sampling theory with its homogeneous populations and sampling practice with its heterogeneous sampling units and sample spaces.

Visman studied mining engineering at the Delft University of Technology, and was employed at the Dutch State Mines during the Second World War. He surfaced after the war with a massive amount of test results determined in samples selected from heterogeneous sampling units of coal. In fact, he had gathered so much valuable information that he was encouraged to write a PhD thesis on the sampling of coal. Jan Visman defended his PhD thesis titled "De Monsterneming van Heterogene Binomiale Korrelmengsels, in het Bijzonder Steenkool" at the Technical University of Delft on 17 December 1947.

Visman proved that the variance of the primary sample selection stage (the sampling variance) is the sum of the composition variance and the distribution variance. The composition variance is a measure for variability between particles within primary increments. The distribution variance, in contrast, is a measure for variability between primary increments in a sampling unit, and, thus, for its degree of heterogeneity. He described a simple experiment to estimate the composition and distribution components of the sampling variance. The distribution heterogeneity causes spatial dependence between measured values in ordered sets determined in sampling units and sample spaces.

Visman worked briefly in Ottawa after immigrating to Canada in 1951. Until his retirement in 1976, he headed the Western Regional Laboratories of the Department of Mines and Technical Surveys, which is nowadays known as Energy, Mines & Resources. These laboratories were located in Calgary until 1955 when they moved to Edmonton and are still operating alongside the Alberta Research Council at the Coal Research Centre in Devon, Alberta.

Visman wrote Towards a Common Basis for the Sampling of Materials, Mines Branch Research Report R 93, which was published in July 1962. He participated in ASTM Committees D-5 on Coal and Coke and E-11 on Statistics. ASTM D 2234 Standard Practice for Collection of a Gross Sample of Coal was the first internationally recognized standard to specify a precision estimate for a measured variable. Visman's sampling experiment with small and large increments is described in ASTM D 2234, Annex A1. Test Method for Determining the Variance Components of a Coal. Visman's paper titled A General Sampling Theory was published in the November 1969 issue of Materials Research & Standards.

Jan Visman was an accidental sampling expert because his true calling was coal processing but he became interested in sampling because of his need to understand this process. His innovative work inspired a great deal of progress in sampling theory and practice in many scientific disciplines. His brilliant mind succumbed long before he died on February 19, 2006. Jan Visman's contribution to the bridging of the breach between sampling theory and sampling practice for materials in bulk should be remembered.
