= Clair Francomano =

American geneticist

Clair A. Francomano is an American medical geneticist and academic specializing in Ehlers–Danlos syndromes. She is Professor of Medical and Molecular Genetics at Indiana University.

== Early life, education and training ==
Clair Ann Francomano was born to Mrs. and Charles J. Francomano, a general practitioner. She attended Roosevelt High School in Yonkers, New York and participated in programs at the National Institutes of Health and the Jackson Laboratory in Bar Harbor, Maine as a high school student. She earned her undergraduate degree from Yale College in 1976, having returned as an undergraduate to the Jackson Laboratory to study cancer genetics on a National Science Foundation grant in 1973. She then earned her M.D. from Johns Hopkins School of Medicine in 1980. She trained at Hopkins in internal medicine and medical genetics.

== Career ==
Francomano joined the faculty of Johns Hopkins University in 1984. In 1994, she moved to the National Institutes of Health to become chief of the Medical Genetics Branch at the National Human Genome Research Institute; from 1996 to 2001 she was its clinical director. From 2001 to 2005 she was Chief of the Human Genetics and Integrative Medicine Section in the Laboratory of Genetics, National Institute on Aging. While at NIH, she launched a natural history study of Ehlers–Danlos syndromes that lasted for more than two decades. She also worked on the Human Genome Project.

In 2005, Francomano became director of adult genetics for the Harvey Institute of Human Genetics of the Greater Baltimore Medical Center. She later became director of its Ehlers–Danlos National Foundation Center for Clinical Care and Research.

Francomano has been a member of the Steering Committee for the International Consortium on the Ehlers–Danlos Syndromes and Related Conditions. Since 2016, she has chaired the Consortium's Committee on Classical Ehlers–Danlos Syndrome.

In 2019 she joined Indiana University as professor of medical and molecular genetics at the School of Medicine and director of the Residency Training Program in Genetics.

== Notable publications ==
- Dietz, Harry C.; Cutting, Carry R.; Pyeritz, Reed E.; Maslen, Cheryl L.; Sakai, Lynn Y.; Corson, Glen M.; Puffenberger, Erik G.; Hamosh, Ada; Nanthakumar, Elizabeth J.; Curristin, Sheila M.; Stetten, Gail; Meyers, Deborah A.; Francomano, Clair A. (July 1991). "Marfan syndrome caused by a recurrent de novo missense mutation in the fibrillin gene". Nature. 352 (6333): 337–339. Bibcode:1991Natur.352..337D. doi:10.1038/352337a0. ISSN 1476-4687. PMID 1852208. S2CID 4252445.
- Schwindinger, W. F.; Francomano, C. A.; Levine, M. A. (1 June 1992). "Identification of a mutation in the gene encoding the alpha subunit of the stimulatory G protein of adenylyl cyclase in McCune–Albright syndrome". Proceedings of the National Academy of Sciences. 89 (11): 5152–5156. Bibcode:1992PNAS...89.5152S. doi:10.1073/pnas.89.11.5152. ISSN 0027-8424. PMC 49247. PMID 1594625.
- Bellus, G A; Hefferon, T W; Ortiz de Luna, R I; Hecht, J T; Horton, W A; Machado, M; Kaitila, I; McIntosh, I; Francomano, C A (February 1995). "Achondroplasia is defined by recurrent G380R mutations of FGFR3". American Journal of Human Genetics. 56 (2): 368–373. ISSN 0002-9297. PMC 1801129. PMID 7847369.
- Bellus, Gary A.; McIntosh, Iain; Smith, E. Anne; Aylsworth, Arthur S.; Kaitila, Ilkka; Horton, William A.; Greenhaw, Giselle A.; Hecht, Jacqueline T.; Francomano, Clair A. (July 1995). "A recurrent mutation in the tyrosine kinase domain of fibroblast growth factor receptor 3 causes hypochondroplasia". Nature Genetics. 10 (3): 357–359. doi:10.1038/ng0795-357. ISSN 1546-1718. PMID 7670477. S2CID 22560890.
- Fried, Linda P.; Francomano, Clair A.; MacDonald, Susan M.; Wagner, Elizabeth M.; Stokes, Emma J.; Carbone, Kathryn M.; Bias, Wilma B.; Newman, Mary M.; Stobo, John D. (18 September 1996). "Career Development for Women in Academic Medicine: Multiple Interventions in a Department of Medicine". JAMA. 276 (11): 898–905. doi:10.1001/jama.1996.03540110052031. ISSN 0098-7484. PMID 8782639.
- Vajo, Zoltan; Francomano, Clair A.; Wilkin, Douglas J. (1 February 2000). "The Molecular and Genetic Basis of Fibroblast Growth Factor Receptor 3 Disorders: The Achondroplasia Family of Skeletal Dysplasias, Muenke Craniosynostosis, and Crouzon Syndrome with Acanthosis Nigricans*". Endocrine Reviews. 21 (1): 23–39. doi:10.1210/edrv.21.1.0387. PMID 10696568. S2CID 43581040.
