= Nature Genetics =

- Discipline: Genetics
- Language: English
- Edited by: Tiago Faial

Publication details
- History: 1992–present
- Publisher: Nature Portfolio
- Frequency: Monthly
- Open access: Hybrid
- Impact factor: 25.5 (2025)

Standard abbreviations
- ISO 4: Nat. Genet.

Indexing
- CODEN: NGENEC
- ISSN: 1061-4036 (print); 1546-1718 (web)
- OCLC no.: 25302333

Links
- Journal homepage; Online archive

Nature Genetics is a peer-reviewed scientific journal published by Nature Portfolio. It was established in 1992. It covers research in genetics. The chief editor is Tiago Faial.

The journal encompasses genetic and functional genomic studies on human traits and on other model organisms. Current emphasis is on the genetic basis for common and complex diseases and on the functional mechanism, architecture and evolution of gene networks, studied by experimental perturbation.

According to the Journal Citation Reports, the journal has a 2025 impact factor of 25.5, ranking it 2nd out of 191 journals in the category "Genetics & Heredity". Further evaluation metrics from Scopus and Journal Citation Reports are outlined in the following table.

Journal ranking summary for Nature Genetics (2023)
| Source | Category | Rank | Percentile | Quartile |
|---|---|---|---|---|
| Scopus | Genetics in Biochemistry, Genetics and Molecular Biology | 4/347 | 98.85 | Q1 |
| IF (Web of Science) | GENETICS & HEREDITY | 2/191 | 99.20 | Q1 |
| JCI (Web of Science) | GENETICS & HEREDITY | 1/191 | 99.48 | Q1 |
