= Shewhart Medal =

American award for achievements in quality control

- Awarded for: Outstanding technical leadership in the field of modern quality control
- Country: United States
- Presented by: American Society for Quality
- First award: 1948
- Website: https://asq.org/about-asq/asq-awards/shewhart

The Shewhart Medal, named in honour of Walter A. Shewhart, is awarded annually by the American Society for Quality for "...outstanding technical leadership in the field of modern quality control, especially through the development to its theory, principles, and techniques." The first medal was awarded in 1948.

- 1948 Leslie E. Simon
- 1949 Harold F. Dodge
- 1950 Martin A. Brumbaugh
- 1951 George D. Edwards
- 1952 Eugene L. Grant
- 1953 Harry G. Romig
- 1954 Edwin G. Olds
- 1955 W. Edwards Deming
- 1956 Mason E. Wescott
- 1957 Cecil C. Craig
- 1958 Irving W. Burr
- 1959 Paul S. Olmstead
- 1960 Ellis R. Ott
- 1961 Leonard H. C. Tippett
- 1962 Lloyd A. Knowler
- 1964 Acheson J. Duncan
- 1965 Paul C. Clifford
- 1966 Edward P. Coleman
- 1967 Charles A. Bicking
- 1968 George E. P. Box
- 1969 William J. Youden
- 1970 John Stuart Hunter
- 1971 Frank E. Grubbs
- 1972 Gerald J. Lieberman
- 1973 Sebastian B. Littauer
- 1974 Benjamin Epstein
- 1975 William R. Pabst Jr.
- 1976 John W. Tukey
- 1977 Albert H. Bowker
- 1978 Lloyd S. Nelson
- 1979 Hugo C. Hamaker
- 1980 John Mandel
- 1981 Richard A. Freund
- 1982 Kaoru Ishikawa
- 1983 Edward G. Schilling
- 1984 Norman L. Johnson
- 1985 Ronald D. Snee
- 1986 Donald W. Marquardt
- 1987 Fred Leone
- 1988 Harrison M. Wadsworth
- 1989 Dorian Shainin
- 1990 William J. Hill
- 1991 Cuthbert Daniel
- 1992 Gerald J. Hahn
- 1993 Harry Smith Jr.
- 1994 Brian L. Joiner
- 1995 Genichi Taguchi
- 1996 Douglas C. Montgomery
- 1997 John F. MacGregor
- 1998 Raymond H. Myers
- 1999 James M. Lucas
- 2000 John A. Cornell
- 2001 Søren Bisgaard
- 2002 William H. Woodall
- 2003 Wayne B. Nelson
- 2004 Douglas M. Hawkins
- 2005 Norman Draper
- 2006 William Q. Meeker
- 2007 C. F. Jeff Wu
- 2008 Roger W. Hoerl
- 2009 David W. Bacon
- 2010 G. Geoffrey Vining
- 2011 Jerald Lawless
- 2012 Robert L. Mason
- 2013 G. Geoffrey Vining
- 2014 Bovas Abraham
- 2015 Dennis K.J. Lin
- 2016 Connie M. Borror
- 2017 David M. Steinberg
- 2018 Christine Anderson-Cook
- 2019 Ronald Does
- 2020 Necip Doganaksoy
- 2021 Jianjun Shi
- 2022 Bradley Jones
- 2023 Stefan Steiner
- 2024 Peihua Qiu
- 2025 Fugee Tsung

== See also ==
- List of mathematics awards
- Wilks Memorial Award, awarded by the American Statistical Association
