= George Box Medal =

- Awarded for: Distinction in statistics
- Presented by: European Network for Business and Industrial Statistics (ENBIS)
- First award: 2003
- Website: http://www.enbis.org/awards/george_box_medal

The George Box Medal is an insignia of an award named after the statistician George Box. It is awarded annually by the European Network for Business and Industrial Statistics (ENBIS) in recognition of outstanding work in the development and the application of statistical methods in European business and industry.

ENBIS also awards an early-career counterpart to the George Box medal, the Young Statistician Award.

== Past Recipients ==
Source: ENBIS

- 2003 George Box
- 2004 Søren Bisgaard
- 2005 Sir David Cox
- 2006 Gerry Hahn
- 2007 Poul Thyregod
- 2008 Doug Montgomery
- 2009 Tony Greenfield
- 2010 David Stewardson
- 2011 Henry Philip Wynn
- 2012 Bill Woodall
- 2013 David Steinberg
- 2014 John F. MacGregor
- 2015 Geoffrey Vining
- 2016 David J. Hand
- 2017 C. F. Jeff Wu
- 2018 Ron S. Kenett
- 2019 Ronald J.M.M. Does
- 2020 William Q. Meeker
- 2021 Christine Anderson-Cook
- 2022 Jianjun Shi
- 2023 Bianca Maria Colosimo
- 2024 Peter Rousseeuw
- 2025 Alberto Ferrer
- 2026 Bradley Jones

== Young Statistician Award ==
The Young Statistician Award recognizes young professionals under 35 for innovative and impactful contributions to statistics in academic or industrial settings. It highlights achievements in developing methods, promoting statistics, or applying it effectively in practice. It's past recipients are:

- 2005 Jesus Palomo and Jeroen de Mast
- 2006 Peter Goos
- 2007 Nadine Henkenjohann
- 2008 Martina Erdbrügge
- 2009 Bart De Ketelaere
- 2010 Olivier Roustant
- 2011 Christian Weiß
- 2012 Maroussa Zagoraiou
- 2013 Wouter Saeys
- 2014 Arthur Tenenhaus
- 2015 Marit Schoonhoven
- 2016 Nicolas Bousquet
- 2017 Antonio Canale
- 2018 Abel Folch-Fortuny and Alessandra Menafoglio
- 2019 Rebecca Killick
- 2020 Raffaele Vitale
- 2021 Inez M. Zwetsloot
- 2022 Mickaël Binois
- 2023 Nathaniel Stevens
- 2024 Joan Borràs-Ferrís
- 2025 Jakob Raymaekers
- 2026 Fabio Centofanti

== See also ==
- List of mathematics awards
