= Chen Zhunmin =

Chen Zhunmin (Chinese: 陈准民; pinyin: Chén Zhǔnmín; born November 1951) is a Chinese educator and former president of the University of International Business and Economics in Beijing, China.

== Biography ==
Chen was born in Shanghai in 1951. He received his bachelor's degree from Shanghai Foreign Language Institute in 1977 and master's degree in English from the University of California, Los Angeles in 1983.

After graduation, Chen joined the faculty in the University of International Business and Economics. He became the president of the university in 1999 and held this position until June 2009.

Chen teaches business, management, and business communications. He published some textbooks such as Let's Talk Business, Spoken English for International Business, and Fundamentals of Business.

Academic offices
| Preceded by Sun Weiyan | President of the Beijing University of International Business and Economics; 1999-2009 | Succeeded by Shi Jianjun |
