= Ying Hung =

Taiwanese-American statistician

Ying Hung is a Taiwanese-American statistician whose research centers on computer experiments, the use of the design of experiments to plan scientific and engineering simulations, and includes work on kriging, metamodeling, and the use of computer optimization techniques in the design of experiments. She is a professor of statistics at Rutgers University.

== Education and career ==
Hung graduated from National Taiwan University with a bachelor's degree in mathematics in 2001. She earned a master's degree in statistics from National Tsing Hua University in 2003, and completed a Ph.D. in industrial and systems engineering from Georgia Tech in 2008. Her dissertation, Contributions to Computer Experiments and Binary Time Series, was supervised by C. F. Jeff Wu.

She joined the Rutgers University Department of Statistics as an assistant professor in 2008, earned tenure there as an associate professor in 2014, and was promoted to full professor in 2020.

== Recognition ==
Hung won the 2014 Tweedie New Researcher Award of the Institute of Mathematical Statistics. She was named to the 2022 class of Fellows of the Institute of Mathematical Statistics, for "fundamental contributions to design, statistical analysis, and uncertainty quantification of computer experiments with applications in cell biology". She was elected as a Fellow of the American Statistical Association in 2024.
