= Christine Anderson-Cook =

Canadian statistician (born 1966)

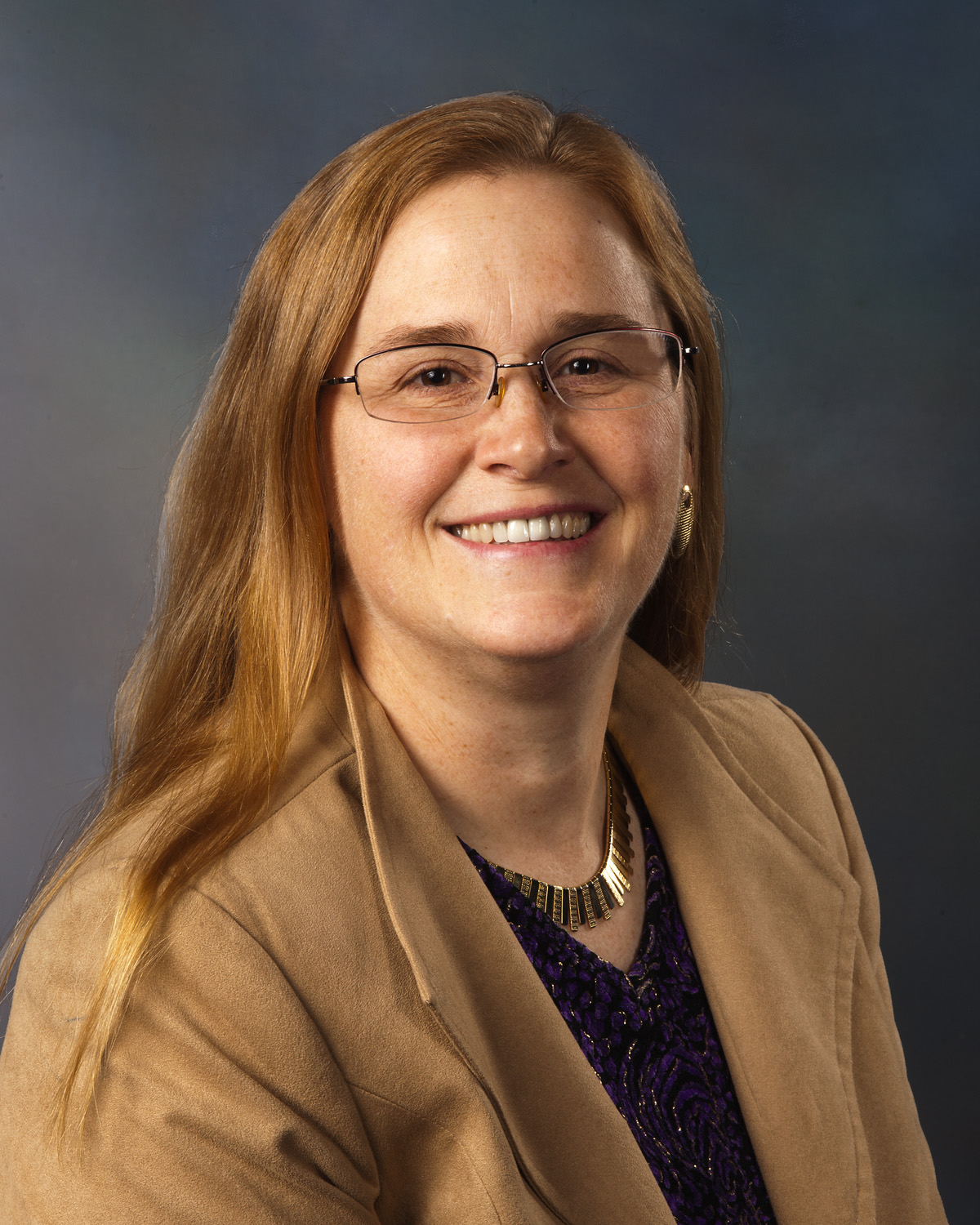
- Christine M. Anderson-Cook
- Born: 1966 (age 59–60)
- Education: Western University; University of Waterloo; University of Toronto
- Occupation: Statistician

Christine Michaela Anderson-Cook (born 1966) is an American and Canadian statistician known for her work on the design of experiments, response surface methodology, reliability analysis in quality engineering, multiple objective optimization and decision-making, and the applications of statistics in nuclear forensics. She has published over 250 research articles in statistical, engineering and interdisciplinary journals. She has also written on misunderstandings caused by "hidden jargon": technical terms in statistics that are difficult to distinguish from colloquial English.

Anderson-Cook is a project leader in the US National Technical Nuclear Forensics Center, a research scientist at the Los Alamos National Laboratory, and a former chair of the American Statistical Association Section of Quality and Productivity and of the American Society for Quality Statistics Division.

== Education and career ==
Anderson-Cook did her undergraduate studies at Western University and the University of Waterloo, earning a bachelor's degree in education from Western University and a bachelor's degree in mathematics from Waterloo in 1989. She moved to the University of Toronto for a master's degree in statistics in 1990, and returned to Waterloo for her Ph.D., which she completed in 1994. Her dissertation, Location and Dispersion Analysis for Factorial Experiments with Directional Data, was supervised by C. F. Jeff Wu.

She was an assistant professor of statistics and actuarial science at Western University and then, beginning in 1996, an associate professor of statistics at Virginia Tech, before moving to Los Alamos in 2004. She chaired the American Statistical Association Section of Quality and Productivity in 2006, and the American Society for Quality Statistics Division in 2010.

== Book ==
Anderson-Cook is a co-author of the 3rd and 4th editions of the book Response Surface Methodology: Process and Product Optimization Using Designed Experiments (with Raymond H. Myers and Douglas C. Montgomery, Wiley, 2009 and 2016).

== Recognition ==
Anderson-Cook became a Fellow of the American Statistical Association in 2006, and a Fellow of the American Society for Quality in 2011 "for research in quality in the areas of design of experiments and reliability, for interdisciplinary collaboration and training of statistical thinking and quality ideas, and for dedicated service to the growth and practice of the quality profession". The American Society for Quality gave Anderson-Cook their William G. Hunter Award in 2012, and their Shewhart Medal "for exemplary leadership, service, training, research, and applications in solving complex problems through statistical thinking and statistical engineering" in 2018. She won the Don Owen Award of the San Antonio Chapter of the American Statistical Association in 2019. She became the first female recipient of the George Box Medal in 2021. She was also the winner of the Gerald J. Hahn Q&P Achievement Award in 2021. The American Statistical Association gave Anderson-Cook the Army Wilks Memorial Award and recognized her as someone "who has made a substantial contribution to statistical methodology and application impacting the practice of statistics in the Army through personal research in statistics or application of statistics in the solution of Army problems" in 2024.
