= Jun Yu =

Economist

- Born: June 5, 1969 (age 57); Ezhou, China

Academic background
- Education: Wuhan University (BSc and BA 1990); University of Western Ontario (PhD 1998)
- Influences: Peter C.B. Phillips; John L. Knight

Academic work
- Discipline: Econometrics
- Institutions: University of Macau
- Website: https://fba.um.edu.mo/faculty/junyu/; Information at IDEAS / RePEc

Jun Yu (born June 5, 1969) is an econometrician. He is the University of Macau Development Foundation (UMDF) Chair Professor of Finance and Economics and the Dean of Faculty of Business Administration at University of Macau. He has previously taught at Singapore Management University and University of Auckland.

== Biography ==
Yu was born in Ezhou, China. He obtained a BSc in mathematics and BA in economics at Wuhan University in 1990. He began graduate studies in economics at the University of Western Ontario in 1994 under John L. Knight and received his Ph.D. in 1998.

Yu serves as an associate editor for the Journal of Econometrics, and the Econometric Theory.

== Research ==
Yu's research concentrates on stochastic volatility models, continuous-time models, Bayesian econometrics, and the econometric analysis of economic bubbles. He has developed methods that can detect economic bubbles using time series data. He has also co-authored Financial Econometric Modeling, a financial econometrics textbook published by Oxford University Press.

He has an h-index of 37.

== Awards ==
Yu was elected a Founding Fellow of the Society for Financial Econometrics in 2012. He is also a Fellow of the Journal of Econometrics (2011).
