= Kenneth Levenberg =

Kenneth Levenberg (August 6, 1919 – September 1973) was an American statistician and original author of the widely used nonlinear least squares fitting algorithm later improved by Donald Marquardt, known as the Levenberg–Marquardt algorithm.

Levenberg first published the algorithm in 1944 while working at the Frankford Arsenal. He later worked for Boeing where he developed mathematical models used to design the Boeing 737. He ended his career in the mathematics department at the University of Hawaiʻi at Hilo and died in Hawaii in 1973.

Levenberg was listed in American Men of Science in 1970.
