= William H. Lawton =

American statistician

- Born: William Harvey Lawton; November 1, 1937; Indianapolis, Indiana, U.S.
- Died: July 9, 2012 (aged 74); Rochester, New York, U.S.
- Education: University of California, Berkeley
- Occupation: Statistician
- Spouse: Ann Lawton

William Harvey Lawton (November 1, 1937 – July 9, 2012) was an American statistician.

== Early life and education ==
Lawton was born in Indianapolis, Indiana. At an early age, he and his family moved to Denver, Colorado, and then to Kensington, California. In 1948, he contracted polio, and he attended El Cerrito High School, graduating in 1955. During his high school years, he was the school's yearbook photographer, and was the reporter of El Caballero, the school's newspaper.

After graduating, Lawton attended the University of California, Berkeley (UCB), earning his master's degree in statistics. He worked in the management systems development division at Kodak, an electronics company in Rochester, New York. After his brief time at Kodak, he returned to UCB, and earned his PhD degree under the supervision of Erich Lehmann.

== Career ==
Lawton returned to Kodak. During his time, he served as group leader of the Mathematical Analysis Group, and was supervisor of the Applied Mathematics Section. In 1974, he was awarded the Frank Wilcoxon Prize, "for outstanding Technometrics paper on practical application".

From 1975 to 1977, Lawton served as editor of the statistics journal Technometrics, and in 1983, he was named a fellow of the American Association for the Advancement of Science, "for the development of new statistical techniques for analysis of chemical and physical systems, and for contributions to scientific publishing". He retired from Kodak in 1990, and he served as a professor in the department of marketing at the University of Rochester.

In 1995, Lawton awarded the William G. Hunter Award by the Statistics Division of the American Society for Quality, "for contribution to statistics education and integration of statistics with other discipline".

== Personal life and death ==
Lawton was married to Ann, and their marriage lasted until Lawton's death in 2026.

In the 2000s, Lawton was admitted to the University of Rochester Medical Center's Strong Memorial Hospital, and was diagnosed with a brain tumor. After his diagnosis, he moved to Phoenix, Arizona, and was treated at the Barrow Neurological Institute.

Lawton died on July 9, 2012, in Rochester, New York, at the age of 75.
