= MSPE =

MSPE may refer to:

- Mindful Sport Performance Enhancement: a mental training program for athletes and coaches
- Mean squared prediction error
- Mean squared pure error
- Medical School Performance Evaluation (or dean's letter): a formal, written evaluation of a medical student
- Mercenaries, Spies and Private Eyes, a role-playing game written by Michael A. Stackpole and published by Flying Buffalo
- Master of Science, Power Engineering
