= John Stuart Hunter =

American statistician and engineer (born 1923)

John Stuart Hunter (born June 3, 1923) is an American statistician and engineer whose career has spanned academia and industry. He is considered a pioneer of the application of statistical methods, especially experimental design and quality control, to industrial engineering. He is an elected fellow of the American Statistical Association, the American Society for Quality, and the American Association for the Advancement of Science.

== Early life and education ==
Hunter was born on June 3, 1923. He earned his BSc (1947) in electrical engineering, his MS (1949) in engineering mathematics, and his PhD (1954) in statistics from North Carolina State University. His PhD thesis, Multi-factor experimental designs, was written under the tutelage of Robert John Hader.

== Career ==
During World War II, Hunter was called up and joined the United States Army. He was initially assigned to the Army Specialized Training Program at NC State and later served in Philippines. After earning his PhD he worked at American Cyanamid. He joined Princeton University in 1961, where he is now professor emeritus, School of Engineering and Applied Science.

Hunter was the founding editor of the statistical journal Technometrics from 1959 to 1963. He was president of the American Statistical Association in 1992.

== Later life ==
Hunter turned 100 on June 3, 2023.

== Honors and awards ==
In 1987, Hunter was awarded the US Army's Wilks Memorial Medal and Award

Hunter has been widely recognized for his contributions to statistical methodology and industrial engineering.

- 1959 and 1985, recipient of the ASQ's Brumbaugh Award
- 1961, elected fellow of the American Statistical Association
- 1965, elected fellow of the American Association for the Advancement of Science
- 1970, recipient of the Shewhart Medal
- 1985, recipient of the ASQ's Deming Medal
- 1987, recipient of the United States Army Samuel S. Wilks Memorial Medal and Award
- 1995, recipient of the American Statistical Association Founders Award
- 1998, elected honorary member of the American Society for Quality (ASQ)
- 2004, named Distinguished Alumnus for the College of Physical and Mathematical Sciences, North Carolina State University
- 2005, elected member of the National Academy of Engineering
- 2006, awarded an honorary DSc from North Carolina State University
- 2008, awarded an honorary DSc from Pennsylvania State University
- 2015, recipient of the William G. Hunter Award presented by the Statistics Division of the American Society for Quality (Note: William G. Hunter and John Stuart Hunter are not related.)

== Selected publications ==
=== Books ===
- Guttman, Irwin; Wilks, S. S.; Hunter, J. Stuart (1965). Introductory Engineering Statistics. Wiley.
- Hunter, J. Stuart (1971). Statistics for problem solving and decision making: A course for management and professional personnel on quantitative methods.
- Box, George E. P.; Hunter, William G.; Hunter, J. Stuart (1978). Statistics for Experimenters: An Introduction to Design, Data Analysis, and Model Building. Wiley. ISBN 978-0-471-09315-2.
- Box, George E. P.; Hunter, J. Stuart; Hunter, William G. (2005). Statistics for Experimenters: Design, Innovation, and Discovery. John Wiley & Sons. ISBN 978-0-471-71813-0.

=== Journal articles ===
- Hunter, J. Stuart (1983). "The Birth of a Journal". Technometrics. 25: 3–7. doi:10.1080/00401706.1983.10487814.
- Hunter, J. Stuart (1985). "Statistical Design Applied to Product Design". Journal of Quality Technology. 17 (4): 210–221. doi:10.1080/00224065.1985.11978971. (Note: Hunters's Statistical Design Applied to Product Design won the ASQ's Brumbaugh Award in 1985.)
- Hunter, J. Stuart (1986). "The Exponentially Weighted Moving Average". Journal of Quality Technology. 18 (4): 203–210. doi:10.1080/00224065.1986.11979014.
- Hunter, J. Stuart (1994). "Statistics as a Profession". Journal of the American Statistical Association. 89 (425): 1–6. doi:10.1080/01621459.1994.10476440.
