= Grubbs's test =

Statistical test

In statistics, Grubbs's test or the Grubbs test (named after Frank E. Grubbs, who published the test in 1950), also known as the maximum normalized residual test or extreme studentized deviate test, is a test used to detect outliers in a univariate data set assumed to come from a normally distributed population.

== Definition ==
Grubbs's test is based on the assumption of normality. That is, one should first verify that the data can be reasonably approximated by a normal distribution before applying the Grubbs test.

Grubbs's test detects one outlier at a time. This outlier is expunged from the dataset and the test is iterated until no outliers are detected. However, multiple iterations change the probabilities of detection, and the test should not be used for sample sizes of six or fewer since it frequently tags most of the points as outliers.

Grubbs's test is defined for the following hypotheses:

H_{0}: There are no outliers in the data set
H_{a}: There is exactly one outlier in the data set

The Grubbs test statistic is defined as

$$G =  \frac{\displaystyle\max_{i=1,\ldots, n}\left \vert Y_i - \bar{Y}\right\vert}{s}$$

with n, $\overline{Y}$, and $s$ denoting the number of measurements in the sample, sample mean, and standard deviation, respectively. The Grubbs test statistic is the largest absolute deviation from the sample mean in units of the sample standard deviation.

This is the two-sided test, for which the hypothesis of no outliers is rejected at significance level α if

$$G > \frac{n-1}{\sqrt{n}} \sqrt{\frac{t_{\alpha/(2n),n-2}^2}{n - 2 + t_{\alpha/(2n),n-2}^2}}$$

with t_{α/(2n),n−2} denoting the upper critical value of the t-distribution with n − 2 degrees of freedom and a significance level of α/(2n).

=== One-sided case ===
Grubbs's test can also be defined as a one-sided test, replacing α/(2n) with α/n. To test whether the minimum value is an outlier, the test statistic is

$$G = \frac{\bar{Y}-Y_\min}{s}$$

with Y_{min} denoting the minimum value. To test whether the maximum value is an outlier, the test statistic is

$$G = \frac{Y_\max - \bar{Y}}{s}$$

with Y_{max} denoting the maximum value.

== Related techniques ==
Several graphical techniques can be used to detect outliers. A simple run sequence plot, a box plot, or a histogram should show any obviously outlying points. A normal probability plot may also be useful.

== See also ==
- Chauvenet's criterion
- Peirce's criterion
- Q test
- Studentized residual
- Tau distribution
