= Ellis R. Ott =

American statistician (died 1981)

- Born: Ellis Raymond Ott; Dexter, Kansas, U.S.
- Died: December 23, 1981 (aged 75); Marble Falls, Texas, U.S.
- Education: Southwestern College (BA); University of Kansas (MA); University of Illinois (PhD)
- Occupations: Statistician; consultant; educator
- Spouse: Virginia Elinor Tillia (m. 1932)
- Children: 3
- Awards: Shewhart Medal

Ellis Raymond Ott (died December 23, 1981) was an American statistician, consultant and educator.

== Early life ==
Ellis Raymond Ott was born in Dexter, Kansas, to George W. Ott. In 1928, he graduated with a Bachelor of Arts from Southwestern College in Kansas. In 1929, he graduated from the University of Kansas with a Master of Arts. He was a member of Gamma Alpha.

Ott taught at the University of Arkansas as a mathematics instructor in 1932. He graduated with a PhD from the University of Illinois in 1933. He then worked as a graduate assistant at the University at Buffalo.

== Career ==
In 1933, Ott became an associate professor of mathematics at the University at Buffalo. He remained there until 1944. Around 1944 in Buffalo, his interest shifted from college algebra to statistical quality control as his University at Buffalo colleague Martin A. Brumbaugh began publishing Industrial Quality Control. In 1946, he joined the National Union Radio Corporation in Newark, New Jersey, as an executive engineer and was in charge at the company of the statistical quality control of the production of guided missiles. In 1946, he returned to the University at Buffalo. He was a professor of mathematics and assistant dean at the university's Millard Fillmore College until August 1946. At the time, Millard Fillmore College was the University at Buffalo's evening college.

Ott then taught at Rutgers University from 1946 to his retirement in 1972. While there, he developed statistical courses that turned into bachelor and Master of Science degree programs. In 1948, he started the annual All-Day Conference on Quality Control and Statistics in Industry. At Rutgers, he taught alongside Harold F. Dodge, Martin Wilk and Horace Andrews. He was professor and chairman of the University College Mathematics Department from 1946 to 1959. He was the founding director of the Statistics Center at Rutgers and served as director from 1959 to 1972. Following his retirement in 1972, he was named professor emeritus. He traveled to India in 1952, 1957 and 1962 to teach statistical quality control in association with the United Nations. He also taught in Mexico and Japan. He was a consultant and lecturer on quality control in statistics. His clients included General Electric, Bristol Myers and Aberdeen Proving Ground.

In April 1937, Ott was elected president of the Buffalo section of the National Council of Teachers of Mathematics. In June 1942, he was elected president of the Buffalo chapter of the American Association of University Professors. He was on the first editorial board of Industrial Quality Control and served as editor of the practical aids column from 1949 to 1965. The column was later published into a book by Quality Press. He was a founding member and served as vice president of the American Society for Quality Control from 1956 to 1960. In January 1950, he succeeded Harry G. Romig as chairman of the metropolitan section of the American Society for Quality Control. He co-wrote College Algebra (1940) with Lewis M. Reagan and Daniel T. Sigley. He also wrote Process Quality Control: Troubleshooting & Interpretation of Data (1975). His book Process Quality Control was based on his experiences consulting. He also contributed articles and papers to professional journals.

== Personal life ==
Ott married Virginia Elinor Tillia, daughter of Henry John Tillia, of Des Moines, Iowa, and Birmingham, Alabama, on December 22, 1932. They had three sons, including Steven. In 1946, they lived on Sterling Drive in Orange, New Jersey. Later in life, he lived in Piscataway, New Jersey.

Ott died on December 23, 1981, aged 75, at his home in Marble Falls, Texas.

== Awards and legacy ==
Ott was elected fellow of the American Society for Quality Control in 1948. He was also named an honorary member. He was also made a fellow of the American Statistical Association. He was awarded the Shewhart Medal in 1960. He was awarded it for his teaching and his leadership in establishing a university graduate program in quality control and applied statistics. He was a recipient of the Grant Award in 1968. In 1968, he won the Brumbaugh Award for his paper Analysis of Means (ANOM) – A Graphical Procedure. He also won the Hoffer Award. He was the namesake of the Ellis R. Ott Award.

Following his death, colleagues of Ott formed the Ellis R. Ott Foundation in tribute. The foundation's goal is to "honor his memory by advancing the goals to which he devoted decades of tireless effort: Applying statistical quality control to maximize industrial productivity and introducing statistical quality control to a broad spectrum of people."
