= Statistica Sinica =

- Discipline: Statistics
- Language: English
- Edited by: Rong Chen, Su-Yun Huang and Xiaotong Shen

Publication details
- History: 1991–present
- Publisher: Academia Sinica and International Chinese Statistical Association
- Frequency: Quarterly
- Impact factor: 1.261 (2020)

Standard abbreviations
- ISO 4: Stat. Sin.
- MathSciNet: Statist. Sinica

Indexing
- ISSN: 1017-0405

Links
- Journal homepage

Statistica Sinica is an international journal publishing papers in all areas of statistics and data science, including theory, methods, and applications. First issued in 1991, this journal published semiannually in January and July from 1991 to 1995. From 1996 onward, it became quarterly in January, April, July, and October. It is co-sponsored by the Institute of Statistical Science, Academia Sinica, and International Chinese Statistical Association.

George C. Tiao was the founding chair editor from 1991 to 1993.

== Abstracting and indexing ==
Statistica Sinica has been indexed and abstracted in Scopus, Science Citation Index Expanded, maintained by Institute for Scientific Information (ISI) and Current Contents (CC) from 1998. It is the first journal in statistics that is included in SCI in Asia. In 2000, it has been indexed in Current Index to Statistics (CIS). The journal is also included in JSTOR database.

== Awards ==
In 1997 to 2004, Statistica Sinica has been awarded "Excellent Academic Research Journal" for 8 consecutive years by National Science Council, R.O.C.
