= George C. Tiao =

American econometrician and statistician (1933–2026)

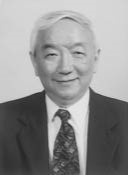
- Tiao in 1980
- Born: November 8, 1933; London, England
- Died: April 25, 2026 (aged 92)
- Education: National Taiwan University (BA); New York University (MBA); University of Wisconsin–Madison (PhD)
- Children: 4
- Scientific career
- Fields: Econometrics
- Institutions: University of Chicago Booth School of Business
- Thesis: Bayesian Assessment of Statistical Assumptions (1962)
- Doctoral advisors: Roger Frederick Miller; George E.P. Box

George Ching-Hwuan Tiao (Chinese: 刁錦寰; November 8, 1933 – April 25, 2026) was a Taiwanese-American econometrician and statistician. He was a professor emeritus of economics and statistics at the University of Chicago Booth School of Business. He was the founding chair editor of Statistica Sinica. He contributed greatly to the field of Bayesian econometrics.

== Life and career ==
Tiao was born in London while both his parents were studying at the London School of Economics and raised in China. In 1950, he moved to Taiwan with his parents and studied at Nanjing Jinling High School. He earned a bachelor's degree in economics from the National Taiwan University. He moved to the United States in 1956 and earned an MBA in banking and finance from New York University in 1958. He earned his PhD in economics from the University of Wisconsin–Madison in 1962. His doctoral advisors were Roger Frederick Miller and George E. P. Box.

After graduating, he worked as a faculty member for twenty years at the University of Wisconsin, serving as chair of the statistics department from 1973 to 1975. Since 1982, he worked at the University of Chicago Booth School of Business.

He was the founding chair editor of Statistica Sinica from 1991 to 1993.

Tiao died on April 25, 2026, at the age of 92.

== Awards and honors ==
Tiao became a fellow of the American Statistical Association in 1973, a fellow of the Institute of Mathematical Statistics in 1974, a member of Academia Sinica in 1976, and a member of the International Statistical Institute in 1980. He was awarded the Wilks Memorial Award in statistics in 2001. Charles III University of Madrid awarded him an honorary doctorate in 2003.

== Bibliography ==
=== Books ===
- Bayesian Inference in Statistical Analysis with George E. P. Box
- A Course in Time Series Analysis with Ruey S. Tsay and Daniel Peña
