= William J. Youden =

American chemist and statistician (1900–1971)

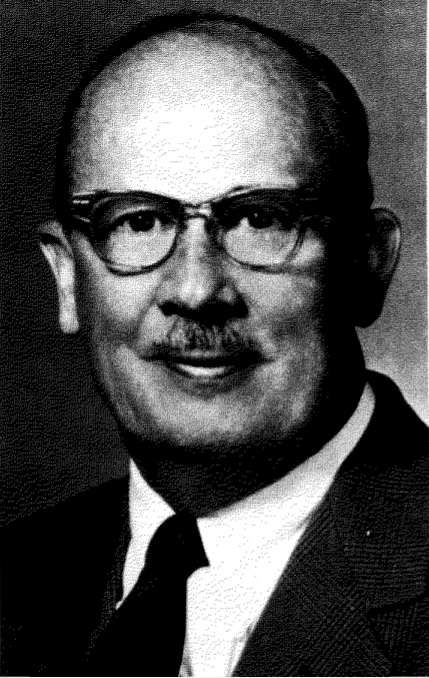
- Born: 12 April 1900; Townsville, Australia
- Died: 31 March 1971 (aged 70); Washington, D.C.
- Other name: Jack Youden
- Education: University of Rochester; Columbia University
- Scientific career
- Fields: Statistics
- Workplaces: Boyce Thompson Institute for Plant Research; National Bureau of Standards
- Doctoral advisor: Hal T. Beans

William John Youden (April 12, 1900 – March 31, 1971), also known as Jack Youden, was an Australian-born American analytical chemist and statistician who formulated new statistical techniques in statistical analysis and in design of experiments. He developed the "Youden square", an incomplete block design developed from a 1937 paper, "Use of Incomplete Block Replications in Estimating Tobacco Mosaic Virus". He also helped to introduce the concept of restricted randomization, which he called constrained randomization. He devised Youden's J statistic as a simple measure summarising the performance of a binary diagnostic test.

== Education and career ==
Youden studied at University of Rochester, where he received his B.S. in chemical engineering in 1921. He stayed at University of Rochester as an instructor until 1922 before going to attend Columbia University for graduate studies. Youden received an M.A. in chemistry in 1923 and a Ph.D. in chemistry in 1924, both from Columbia University. His PhD research was on the gravimetric analysis of zirconium and his advisor was Hal T. Beans.

After graduation, Youden initially worked at the Boyce Thompson Institute for Plant Research (affiliated with Cornell University) in New York State as a physical chemist. He became interested in statistics after reading Ronald Fisher's book Statistical Methods for Research Workers in 1928 and started to contribute to statistics. His first publication in statistical was in 1931. He took a leave from 1937 to 1938 to work with Fisher in his Galton Laboratory based at the University College London. From 1942 to 1945, Youden worked as an operations analyst for the U.S. Army Air Corps. Youden stayed at the Boyce Thompson Institute until 1948 before moving to the National Bureau of Standards (later National Institute of Standards and Technology or NIST), where he was a senior staff member in the Applied Mathematics Division. Youden retired from NIST in 1965.

== Honors and awards ==
In 1951, Youden was elected as a Fellow of the American Statistical Association. The American Statistical Association bestows the W. J. Youden Award in Interlaboratory Testing to authors "of publications that make outstanding contributions to the design and/or analysis of interlaboratory tests or describe ingenious approaches to the planning and evaluation of data from such tests." The award is presented each year at the Joint Statistical Meetings.

In 1967, Youden served as president of the Philosophical Society of Washington, a science organization. In 1969, he was awarded the Shewhart Medal by the American Society for Quality as well as the Wilks Memorial Award by the American Statistical Association.
