= Sallie Ann Keller =

American statistician

- Born: 1956 (age 69–70)

Academic background
- Education: University of South Florida (BS, MS); Iowa State University (PhD)
- Doctoral advisor: William Kennedy

Academic work
- Discipline: Statistician

Sallie Ann Keller (born 1956, also published as Sallie Keller–McNulty) is a statistician and a former president of the American Statistical Association (2006).

She is currently a Distinguished Professor in Biocomplexity and director of the Social and Decision Analytics Division within the Biocomplexity Institute at the University of Virginia. She also joined the United States Census Bureau in October 2022 as Chief Scientist and Associate Director for Research and Methodology, replacing John M. Abowd.

== Education and career ==
Keller received a B.S. and M.S. in mathematics from the University of South Florida, and her Ph.D. in statistics from the Iowa State University in 1983.

She held administrative and academic positions at various universities, including Virginia Tech, University of Waterloo, Rice University, and Kansas State University. Outside of academia, Keller has also held positions with several federal government institutions, including the Science and Technology Policy Institute, the National Science Foundation, and the Los Alamos National Laboratory.

== Affiliations ==
Keller is a fellow of the ASA (1997) and the American Association for the Advancement of Science, as well as an elected member of the International Statistical Institute. She was elected a member of the National Academy of Engineering in 2020 for development and application of engineering and statistical techniques in support of national security and industry.

Keller has edited Statistical Science, the Journal of Computational and Graphical Studies, and the Journal of the American Statistical Society.

== Honors and awards ==
In 2002 Keller-McNulty was recipient of the American Statistical Association Founders Award. Keller won the Wilks Memorial Award in 2021.

== See also ==
- List of presidents of the American Statistical Association
- List of fellows of the American Statistical Association
