= Leslie Earl Simon =

American military officer and scientist

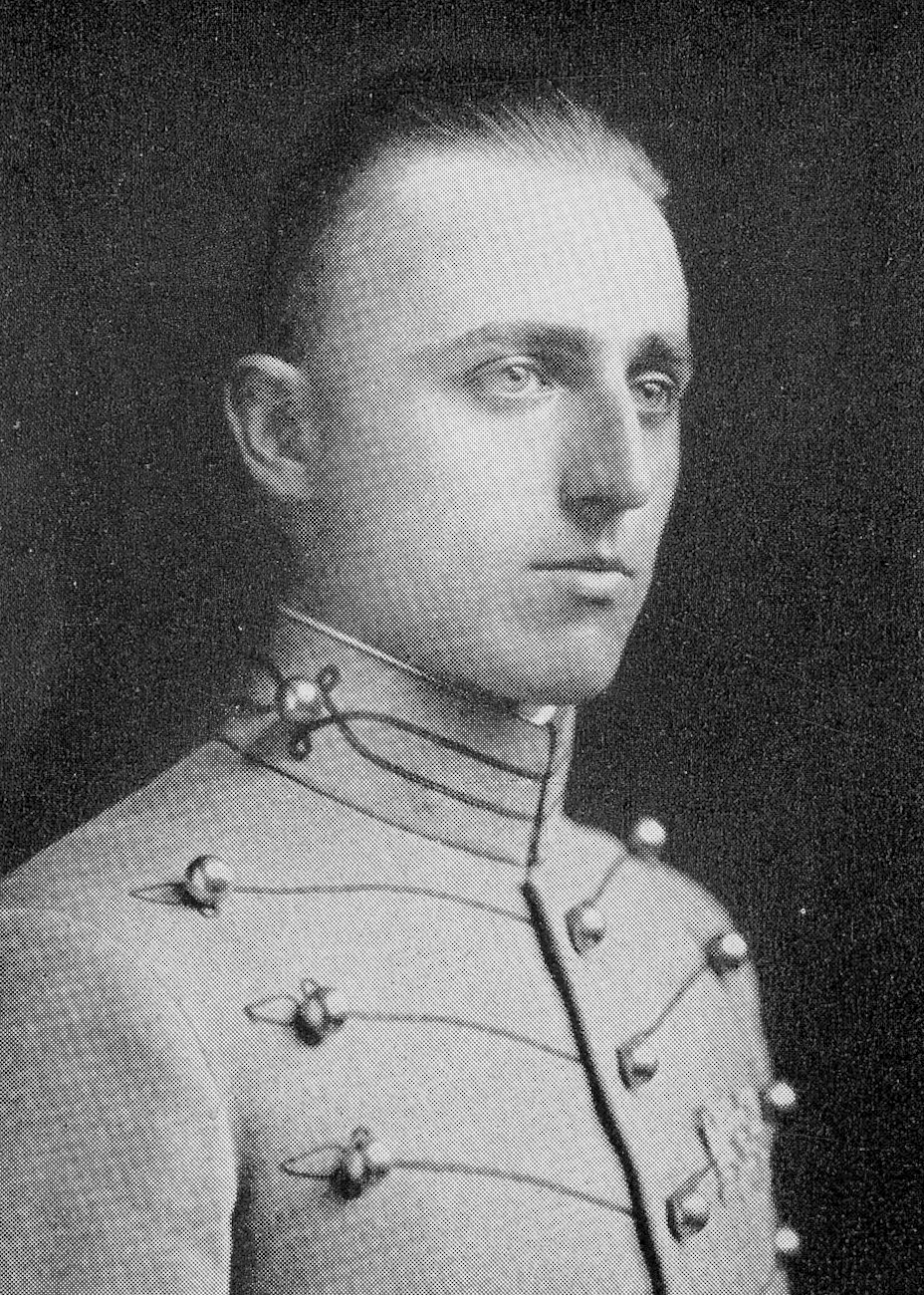
- At West Point in 1924
- Born: August 11, 1900; Memphis, Tennessee
- Died: October 28, 1983 (aged 83); Orlando, Florida
- Burial place: Arlington National Cemetery
- Education: United States Military Academy
- Occupation(s): Military officer, scientist
- Spouse: Marie D. Simon

Leslie Earl Simon (August 11, 1900 – October 28, 1983) was an American military officer and scientist, a major general in the U.S. Army's Ordnance Department, and director of the Ballistic Research Laboratory at the Aberdeen Proving Ground military facility in Maryland.

== Biography ==
Leslie Earl Simon was born in Memphis, Tennessee on August 11, 1900. He graduated from the United States Military Academy at West Point in 1924, eventually attaining the rank of major general. From 1938 to 1941 he served as assistant director of the Ballistic Research Laboratory and from 1941 until 1949 as director, supervising development of the country's first supersonic wind tunnel, the world’s first electronic digital computer, and the Army's missile test range at White Sands, New Mexico. He received the Distinguished Service Medal in 1956. After retiring from the army Simon served for 6 years as a vice-president of the Carborundum Company.

He died in Orlando, Florida on October 28, 1983, and was buried at Arlington National Cemetery.

== Writing ==
An Engineer's Manual of Statistical Methods was an introduction to the quality control methods pioneered by Walter A. Shewhart: it was written for ordnance officers and drew upon Simon's knowledge of munitions production. The book appeared as the United States entered World War II and statisticians were mobilising for the war effort. Simon became a respected figure in the statistics community. In 1945 he was made a Fellow of the American Statistical Association, in 1948 he was the first recipient of the Shewhart Medal and in 1966 he received the Wilks Memorial Award. The citation for the latter read as follows: "To Major General Leslie E. Simon for his pioneering contributions to Quality Control, Sampling Inspection, Reliability and Army Design of Experiments, and for his timely promotion of statistical activities which have benefited not only the Army but our government and country as well."

Simon was one of the Allied scientists sent to Europe at the end of World War II to investigate German weaponry and German Research drew on the experience to discuss various secret weapons, with an emphasis on airplanes, rocketry and the Germans' research methodology. It was first published in 1947. The book has become a collector's item in Europe since Hergé featured it in the storyline of The Adventures of Tintin comic The Calculus Affair, published in 1956, where it appears on page 23. The book is available, nevertheless, in various versions. Hergé censored the swastika, when he inserted the book.

== Selected works ==
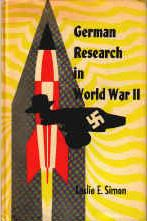
Dust jacket of German research in World War II (1947)

- An Engineer's Manual of Statistical Methods, 1941, John Wiley and Sons, ISBN 1-135-12002-1
- German Research in World War II: An Analysis of the Conduct of Research, 1947, John Wiley.
- German Research was also published under the same title in the UK in 1948 by Chapman & Hall, then republished in 1970 as Secret Weapons of the Third Reich: German Research in World War II by Paladin Press ISBN 0-87364-227-9.
