= Fred C. Leone =

American statistician (1922–2016)

Fred Charles Leone (August 3, 1922 – July 14, 2016) was an American statistician. He was executive director of the American Statistical Association (ASA). He was a fellow of the ASA and was awarded the ASA Founders Award.

Leone earned his BA (1942) from Manhattan College (now Manhattan University), his MS (1943) from Georgetown University and his PhD in statistics from Purdue University (1949). His PhD thesis, written under the tutelage of Irving W. Burr, was titled Some Extensions Of Bayes Theorem. After serving in the United States Navy during World War II, he became an instructor at Case Institute of Technology, rising to the rank of professor in 1964. In 1967, Leone joined the faculty of the Department of Statistics, University of Iowa. In 1973, he left academia and became executive director of the American Statistical Association, where he remained until his retirement in 1988.

Leone was twice recognized for his service to the statistical profession. He became a Fellow of the ASA in 1963, and received the ASA Founders Award in 1989. He was editor of Technometrics from 1964 to 1968.

== Personal life ==
Leone married Elizabeth Spencer in 1945. He died at age 93 in Galion, Ohio.

== Selected publications ==
=== Books ===
- Johnson, Norman L.; Leone, Fred C. (1964). Statistics and experimental design in engineering and the physical sciences. Vol. I and II. New York: Wiley.
- Johnson, Norman Lloyd; Leone, Fred C. (1977). Statistics and experimental design in engineering and the physical sciences (2nd ed.). New York: Wiley. ISBN 978-0-471-01756-1.

=== Journal articles ===
- Topp, Chester W.; Leone, Fred C. (1955). "A Family of J-Shaped Frequency Functions". Journal of the American Statistical Association. 50 (269): 209–219. doi:10.1080/01621459.1955.10501259. ISSN 0162-1459.
- Leone, Fred C.; Nelson, Lloyd S. (1966). "Sampling Distributions of Variance Components I. Empirical Studies of Balanced Nested Designs". Technometrics. 8 (3): 457–468. doi:10.1080/00401706.1966.10490379. ISSN 0040-1706.
- Leone, Fred C.; Jayachandran, Toke; Eisenstat, Stanley (1967). "A Study of Robust Estimators". Technometrics. 9 (4): 652–660. doi:10.1080/00401706.1967.10490513. ISSN 0040-1706.
- Moussa-Hamouda, Effat; Leone, Fred C. (1977). "The Effect of Trimming and Normality Assumptions on the Efficiency of the O-BLUE Estimators". The American Statistician. 31 (4): 158–160. doi:10.1080/00031305.1977.10479227. ISSN 0003-1305.
