= Colin Lingwood Mallows =

English statistician (1930–2023)

- Born: 10 September 1930; Great Sampford, Essex, England
- Died: 4 November 2023 (aged 93); Flemington, New Jersey, USA
- Education: University College London
- Known for: Mallows's C_{p} Fowlkes–Mallows index
- Awards: R. A. Fisher Lectureship; Deming Lectureship; Wilks Memorial Award
- Scientific career
- Fields: Statistics
- Institutions: University College London; Bell Labs; AT&T Labs; Avaya
- Doctoral advisor: Florence Nightingale David; Norman Lloyd Johnson

Colin Lingwood Mallows (10 September 1930 – 4 November 2023) was an English statistician who worked in the United States from 1960. He was known for Mallows's C_{p}, a regression model diagnostic procedure, widely used in regression analysis and the Fowlkes–Mallows index, a popular clustering validation criterion.

== Education and career ==
Mallows began studying at University College London (UCL) in 1948 and received in 1951 his bachelor's degree and in 1953 his PhD (at the age of 22) from under Florence Nightingale David and Norman Lloyd Johnson with thesis Some problems connected with distribution problems. Mallows joined the UCL faculty and taught there from 1955 to 1959 with a sabbatical year at Princeton University in the academic year 1957–1958. He worked for Bell Labs in Murray Hill, New Jersey from 1960 to 1995 and then for AT&T Labs in Florham Park, New Jersey from 1995 to 2000, when he retired. From 2000, Mallows was a consultant for Avaya Labs. He was the author or coauthor of about 140 research publications.

== Death ==
Mallows died on 4 November 2023, at the age of 93.

== Honors and awards ==
Mallows was awarded the R. A. Fisher Lectureship in 1997, the Deming Lectureship in 2004, and the Wilks Memorial Award in 2007. Mallows and George Box are the only two statisticians to have received all three of those honours. He was a Fellow of the American Statistical Association, the Institute of Mathematical Statistics, and the Royal Statistical Society.

Mallows solved a $10,000 mathematical problem posed by John Horton Conway, but declined the prize money on the grounds that the problem was too easy.

== Selected publications ==
- "Generalizations of Tchebycheff's inequalities." Journal of the Royal Statistical Society. Series B (Methodological) (1956): 139–176. JSTOR 2983702?
- with David E. Barton: "The randomization bases of the problem of the amalgamation of weighted means." Journal of the Royal Statistical Society. Series B (Methodological) (1961): 423–433. JSTOR 2984032
- "Latent vectors of random symmetric matrices." Biometrika 48, no. 1–2 (1961): 133–149. doi:10.1093/biomet/48.1-2.133
- with D. E. Barton: "Some aspects of the random sequence." The Annals of Mathematical Statistics (1965): 236–260. JSTOR 2238090
- "An even simpler proof of Opal's inequality." Proc. Amer. Math. Soc. 16 (1965): 173. doi:10.1090/S0002-9939-1965-0170989-6
- with H. L. Frisch and F. A. Bovey. "On the stereoregularity of vinyl polymer chains." The Journal of Chemical Physics 45, no. 5 (1966): 1565–1577. doi:10.1063/1.1727800
- with John Riordan: "The inversion enumerator for labeled trees." Bull. Amer. Math. Soc. 74 (1968): 92–94. doi:10.1090/S0002-9904-1968-11888-9
- With William H. Williams: "Systematic biases in panel surveys due to differential nonresponse." Journal of the American Statistical Association 65, no. 331 (1970): 1338–1349. doi:10.1080/01621459.1970.10481169
- with David F. Andrews: "Scale mixtures of normal distributions." Journal of the Royal Statistical Society. Series B (Methodological) (1974): 99–102. JSTOR 2984774
- with John M. Chambers and B. W. Stuck: "A method for simulating stable random variables." Journal of the American Statistical Association 71, no. 354 (1976): 340–344. doi:10.1080/01621459.1976.10480344
- "Robust methods—some examples of their use." The American Statistician 33, no. 4 (1979): 179–184. doi:10.1080/00031305.1979.10482689
- with Edward B. Fowlkes: "A method for comparing two hierarchical clusterings." Journal of the American Statistical Association 78, no. 383 (1983): 553–569. doi:10.1080/01621459.1983.10478008
- with Siddharta R. Dalal: "When should one stop testing software?." Journal of the American Statistical Association 83, no. 403 (1988): 872–879. doi:10.1080/01621459.1988.10478676
- with David Draper, James S. Hodges, and Daryl Pregibon: "Exchangeability and data analysis." Journal of the Royal Statistical Society. Series A (Statistics in Society) (1993): 9–37. JSTOR 2982858
- with S. R. Dalal: "Factor-covering designs for testing software." Technometrics 40, no. 3 (1998): 234–243. doi:10.1080/00401706.1998.10485524
- Lorraine Denby, James M. Landwehr, Jean Meloche, John Tuck, Bowei Xi, George Michailidis, and Vijayan N. Nair: "Statistical aspects of the analysis of data networks." Technometrics 49, no. 3 (2007): 318–334. doi:10.1198/004017007000000290
