= Technometrics =

- Discipline: Statistics
- Language: English
- Edited by: Roshan Joseph

Publication details
- History: 1959 to present
- Publisher: American Statistical Association & American Society for Quality (US)
- Frequency: Quarterly
- Impact factor: 2.333 (2021)

Standard abbreviations
- ISO 4: Technometrics

Indexing
- ISSN: 0040-1706
- LCCN: 2001-212737
- JSTOR: 00401706
- OCLC no.: 44654121

Links
- Journal homepage

Technometrics is a journal of statistics for the physical, chemical, and engineering sciences, published quarterly since 1959 by the American Society for Quality and the American Statistical Association.

== Statement of purpose ==
The journal describes itself this way: "The purpose of Technometrics is to contribute to the development and use of statistical methods in physical, chemical, and engineering sciences as well as information sciences and technology. This vision includes developments on the interface of statistics and computer science such as data mining, machine learning, large databases, and so on. The journal places a premium on clear communication among statisticians and practitioners of these sciences and an emphasis on the application of statistical concepts and methods to problems that occur in these fields. The journal will publish papers describing new statistical techniques, papers illustrating innovative application of known statistical methods, expository papers on particular statistical methods, and papers dealing with the philosophy and problems of applying statistical methods, when such papers are consistent with the journal's objective. Every article shall include adequate justification of the application of the technique, preferably by means of an actual application to a problem in the physical, chemical, engineering or information sciences. All papers must contain a short, clear summary of contents and conclusions. Mathematical derivations not essential to the flow of the text should be placed in an appendix or a supplementary file. Brief descriptions of problems requiring solution and short technical notes that clearly pertain to the journal's purpose will also be considered for publication. Concise letters to the editor will be published when they are considered timely and appropriate."

== Wilcoxon Award ==
Since 1969, the authors of the paper judged to be the best practical application paper published in the journal each year are awarded the Wilcoxon Award. It is named in honor of Frank Wilcoxon (1892–1965), an American chemist and statistician known for developing several important non-parametric statistical tests, including the Wilcoxon rank-sum test and the Wilcoxon signed-rank test. Past recipients include

- Frank E. Grubbs (1969) - recipient of the inaugural Wilcoxon Prize, co-awarded with the Jack Youden Prize, for a paper published in 1968.
- William S. Cleveland (1975, 1977) - statistician known for developing local regression and data visualization techniques.
- Daniel W. Apley - for papers he published about blind signal separation (in 2008) and concept drift (in 2023)
- Marc Genton and Stefano Castruccio (2017) - for their paper on statistical models for compressing global 3D spatio-temporal temperature ensembles in climate simulations.

== Editor ==
Robert B. Gramacy, Virginia Tech

== Book Reviews Editor ==
S. Ejaz Ahmed, Brock University, Canada

== Former Editors ==
1. John Stuart Hunter (1959–1963)
2. Fred C. Leone (1964–1968)
3. Harry Smith, Jr. (1969–1971)
4. Donald A. Gardiner (1972–1974)
5. William H. Lawton (1975–1977)
6. John W. Wilkinson (1978–1980)
7. Robert G. Easterling (1981–1983)
8. Jerald F. Lawless (1984–1986)
9. William Q. Meeker, Jr. (1987–1989)
10. Vijayan Nair (1990–1992)
11. Stephen B. Vardeman (1993–1995)
12. Max Morris (1996–1998)
13. Karen Kafadar (1999–2001)
14. William I. Notz (2002–2004)
15. Randy R. Sitter (2005–2007)
16. David M. Steinberg (2008–2010)
17. Hugh A. Chipman (2011–2013)
18. Peihua Qiu (2014–2016)
19. Daniel Apley (2017-2019)
20. V. Roshan Joseph (2020-2022)
