= William Hunter (statistician) =

American statistician

Bill Hunter
- Born: 27 March 1937; Buffalo, New York, U.S.
- Died: 29 December 1986 (aged 49); Madison, Wisconsin, U.S.
- Citizenship: U.S.
- Education: Princeton
- Scientific career
- Fields: Statistics
- Workplaces: University of Wisconsin–Madison
- Thesis: Generation and analysis of data in non-linear situations (1972)
- Doctoral advisor: George E. P. Box

William Gordon Hunter, or Bill Hunter, (27 March 1937 – 29 December 1986) was a statistician at the University of Wisconsin–Madison. He was co-author of the classic book Statistics for Experimenters, and co-founder of the Center for Quality and Productivity Improvement with George E. P. Box.

Hunter was born March 27, 1937, in Buffalo, New York. In 1959 he received a bachelor's degree from Princeton and in 1960 a master's from the University of Illinois in chemical engineering. He then became the first doctoral student at the new department of statistics at the University of Wisconsin–Madison founded by George Box.

He contributed to the book Statistics for Experimenters by Box, William Hunter, and John Stuart Hunter (no relation to William Hunter). He founded the Statistics Division of the American Society for Quality and the Center for Quality and Productivity Improvement in Madison, Wisconsin. The Statistics Division of the American Society for Quality gives an annual award called the William G. Hunter Award.

According to Box, "[Hunter] wanted to make a difference in the lives of less fortunate people, and he and his family spent extended periods of time helping third world countries." Hunter taught in Singapore for a year and half and Nigeria for a year, both in the 1970s. In the early 1980s, before China allowed in many foreign experts, he spent a summer lecturing there. He helped build Singapore's quality movement.

Hunter was a leader in the effort to adopt the Deming system of Profound Knowledge and related ideas in the public sector. He contributed to Deming's Out of the Crisis, relating how the city of Madison applied Deming's ideas to a public sector organization.

He was a fellow of the American Statistical Association, the American Association for the Advancement of Science, and the American Society for Quality Control. From 1963 to 1983 he was an associate editor of Technometrics. He was the chairman of the Section on Physical and Engineering Sciences of the American Statistical Association and also served on that organization's board of directors. He served on boards for the National Research Council of the National Academy of Sciences and the National Academy of Engineering.

Hunter died of cancer on December 29, 1986, at the age of 49.

== Selected publications ==
- Box, G.E.P, Hunter, J.S., Hunter, W.G. Statistics for Experimenters
- Hunter, W.G. Managing our way to economic success: two untapped resources (1986)
- Hill, W.J, Hunter, W.G, Duncan, J.W. The next 25 Years in statistics (1986)
- Hunter, W.G, O'Neill, J, Wallen, C. Doing more with less in the public sector: a progress report from Madison, Wisconsin (1986)
- Steinberg, D.M, Hunter, W.G. Experimental design: review and comment (1984)
- Hunter, W.G, Hill, W.J. Design of experiments for subsets of parameters (1973)
- Hill, W.J, Hunter, W.G. Response surface methodology: a review (1966)
- Draper, N.R, Hunter, W.G. Transformation: some examples revisited (1966)
- Hill, W.J, Hunter, W.G. Design of experiments for model discrimination in multiresponse situations (1966)
- Box, G.E.P, Hunter, W.G. The experimental study of physical mechanisms (1965)
