= EVOP =

Optimization technique

Evolutionary Operation (EVOP) is a manufacturing process-optimization technique developed in the 1950s by George E. P. Box.

In EVOP, experimental designs and improvements are introduced, while an ongoing full-scale manufacturing process continues to produce satisfactory results. The idea is that process improvement should not interrupt production.

EVOP is a process or technique of systematic experimentation. Evolutionary Operation (EVOP) is based on the understanding that every production lot has the ability to contribute valuable information on the effect of process variables on a particular product characteristic or feature. Typical methods used involve structured designs of experiments (DOE) which may result in interrupting production flow to conduct the trials or experiments. EVOP, on the other hand, is intended to introduce small changes in the process variables during normal production flow. These changes are not large enough to result in non-conforming product, but are significant enough to determine the optimum process ranges.

== Application ==
Applicable virtually to any applied discipline. Optimization is addressed in all spheres of human enterprise from natural sciences and engineering of whatever discipline, through economics, econometrics, statistics and operations research to management science. Practitioners of mathematical programming who require global optimization methods in diverse technological application. EVOP has been implemented in the following quantitative sectors.

- Nuclear reactor technology
- Mechanical engineering
- Civil engineering
- Structural engineering
- Electrical engineering
- Electronic engineering
- Chemical engineering
- High performance control systems
- Fuzzy logic
- Metallurgy
- Space technology
- Integrated circuit design
- Transport network
- Database
- Image processing
- Molecular biology
- Environmental engineering
- Finance and stock
