= Mallows's Cp =

Statistic used in model selection

In statistics, Mallows's $\boldsymbol{C_p}$, named for Colin Lingwood Mallows, is used to assess the fit of a regression model that has been estimated using ordinary least squares. It is applied in the context of model selection, where a number of predictor variables are available for predicting some outcome, and the goal is to find the best model involving a subset of these predictors. A small value of $C_p$ means that the model is relatively precise.

Mallows's $C_p$ is 'essentially equivalent' to the Akaike information criterion in the case of linear regression. This equivalence is only asymptotic; Akaike notes that $C_p$ requires some subjective judgment in the choice of the variance estimate associated with each response in the linear model (typically denoted as $\hat{\sigma}^2$).

== Definition and properties ==
Mallows's $C_p$ addresses the issue of overfitting, in which model selection statistics such as the residual sum of squares always get smaller as more variables are added to a model. Thus, if we aim to select the model giving the smallest residual sum of squares, the model including all variables would always be selected. Instead, the $C_p$ statistic calculated on a sample of data estimates the sum squared prediction error (SSPE) as its population target

$$E\sum_i (\hat{Y}_i - E(Y_i\mid X_i))^2/\sigma^2,$$

where $\hat{Y}_i$ is the fitted value from the regression model for the ith case, E(Y_{i} | X_{i}) is the expected value for the ith case, and $\sigma^2$ is the error variance (assumed constant across the cases). The mean squared prediction error (MSPE) will not automatically get smaller as more variables are added. The optimum model under this criterion is a compromise influenced by the sample size, the effect sizes of the different predictors, and the degree of collinearity between them.

If p regressors are selected from a set of k regressors, with k > p, the $C_p$ statistic for that particular set of regressors is defined as:

$$C_p={SSE_p \over S^2} - N + 2 (p+1),$$

where

- $SSE_p = \sum_{i=1}^N(Y_i-\hat{Y}_{pi})^2$ is the error sum of squares for the model with p regressors,
- $\hat{Y}_{pi}$ is the predicted value of the ith observation of Y from the p regressors,
- S^{2} is the estimation of residuals variance after regression on the complete set of k regressors and can be estimated by ${1 \over N-k} \sum_{i=1}^N (Y_i- \hat{Y}_i)^2$,
- and N is the sample size.

== Alternative definition ==
Given a linear model such as:

$$Y = \beta_0 + \beta_1X_1+\cdots+\beta_pX_p + \varepsilon$$

where:

- $\beta_0,\ldots,\beta_p$ are coefficients for predictor variables $X_1,\ldots,X_p$
- $\varepsilon$ represents error

An alternate version of $C_p$ can also be defined as:

$$C_p=\frac{1}{N}(\operatorname{RSS} + 2p\hat{\sigma}^2)$$

where

- RSS is the residual sum of squares on a training set of data
- p is the number of predictors
- and $\hat{\sigma}^2$ refers to an estimate of the variance associated with each response in the linear model (estimated on a model containing all predictors)

Note that this version of the $C_p$ does not give equivalent values to the earlier version, but the model with the smallest $C_p$ from this definition will also be the same model with the smallest $C_p$ from the earlier definition.

== Limitations ==
The $C_p$ criterion suffers from two main limitations

1. the $C_p$ approximation is only valid for large sample size;
2. the '$C_p$ cannot handle complex collections of models as in the variable selection (or feature selection) problem.

== Practical use ==
The $C_p$ statistic is often used as a stopping rule for various forms of stepwise regression. Mallows proposed the statistic as a criterion for selecting among many alternative subset regressions. Under a model not suffering from appreciable lack of fit (bias), $C_p$ has expectation nearly equal to p; otherwise the expectation is roughly P plus a positive bias term. Nevertheless, even though it has expectation greater than or equal to p, there is nothing to prevent C_{p} < p or even $C_p < 0$ in extreme cases. It is suggested that one should choose a subset that has $C_p$ approaching p, from above, for a list of subsets ordered by increasing p. In practice, the positive bias can be adjusted for by selecting a model from the ordered list of subsets, such that $C_p < 2p$.

Since the sample-based $C_p$ statistic is an estimate of the MSPE, using $C_p$ for model selection does not completely guard against overfitting. For instance, it is possible that the selected model will be one in which the sample $C_p$ was a particularly severe underestimate of the MSPE.

Model selection statistics such as $C_p$ are generally not used blindly, but rather information about the field of application, the intended use of the model, and any known biases in the data are taken into account in the process of model selection.

== See also ==
- Goodness of fit: Regression analysis
- Coefficient of determination
