= Frank E. Grubbs =

American statistician (1913–2000)

- Born: September 2, 1913; Alabama, US
- Died: January 19, 2000 (aged 86) Maryland, US
- Buried: Five Points Belcher Cemetery
- Allegiance: United States
- Rank: Colonel
- Education: University of Michigan
- Other work: Statistician

Frank Ephraim Grubbs (September 2, 1913 – January 19, 2000) was an American statistician. Grubbs's test for outliers, and the Mann-Grubbs method for calculating a binomial series lower confidence bound, are named after him.

He worked at the Ballistic Research Laboratory while he was a Captain in the U.S. Army.

He retired in 1975 and died on January 19, 2000. He is buried at the Five Points Belcher Cemetery in Alabama.

== Education ==
He received his bachelor's degree from the Alabama Polytechnic Institute. He earned his Ph.D. in Statistics from the University of Michigan in 1949. He studied under Cecil C. Craig and his dissertation research was on the detection of outliers.

== Awards and honors ==
For his contributions to statistics, he was awarded the Wilks Memorial Award by the American Statistical Association in 1964. In 1969, he was the recipient of the first Jack Youden Prize and Frank Wilcoxon Prize for the best expository paper in Technometrics. In 1971, he was awarded the Shewhart Medal by the American Society for Quality.

== Works ==
- Wasting time modeling, eh?, 1975
- Statistical Measures of Accuracy for Riflemen and Missile Engineers, 1964
- Be your own income tax consultant; an analysis of your personal Federal income tax problems, 1962
