= Lighthouse Library (Kansas) =

Library in Dexter, Kansas, the United States

Coordinates: 37°10′45″N 96°43′03″W

Lighthouse Library is a rural community ocean-themed library in Dexter, Kansas. It was built behind the historical Shadid Storefront at 107 S. Main. The new construction is located behind the old brick store that stood as the town's first movie theater at the turn of the century. The library was built by all volunteer labor and through small donations. The library has a 25-foot working lighthouse in its courtyard. On the site is a thrift store (Treasure Chest) and a cabin (Grouse Valley Lodge), both sustaining projects for the library. This project is overseen by Eastern Cowley County Resource Center (ECCRC), a 501 (c)(3) that was founded July 2003 as a memorial tribute to Jennifer Nicole Norris, a local teen who had been killed in an auto accident.
