= Cuthbert Daniel =

American industrial statistician

Cuthbert Daniel (August 27, 1904 – August 8, 1997) was an American industrial statistician.

Daniel was born in Williamsport, Pennsylvania. He obtained bachelor's and master's degrees in chemical engineering from the Massachusetts Institute of Technology, but became interested in statistics through reading Statistical Methods for Research Workers by R. A. Fisher.

In 1955 he was elected as a Fellow of the American Statistical Association. Daniel was awarded the R. A. Fisher Lectureship by the Committee of Presidents of Statistical Societies in 1971, the Wilks Memorial Award by the American Statistical Association in 1974, and the Shewhart Medal by the American Society for Quality in 1991.
