= Connie M. Borror =

American statistician and industrial engineer (1966–2016)

- Born: September 16, 1966; Granite City, Illinois, U.S.
- Died: April 10, 2016 (aged 49)
- Title: ASU Foundation Professor
- Awards: Shewhart Medal

Academic background
- Education: Southern Illinois University Edwardsville
- Alma mater: Arizona State University

Academic work
- Discipline: Statistics, Industrial engineering
- Institutions: Arizona State University
- Main interests: Quality control, Forensic toxicology

Connie M. Borror (September 16, 1966 – April 10, 2016) was an American statistician and industrial engineer interested in quality control and forensic toxicology. She was named the winner of the Shewhart Medal of the American Society for Quality shortly before her death, for "outstanding technical leadership in the field of modern quality control, especially through the development to its theory, principles, and techniques", and became the first woman to win the medal.

== Education and career ==
Borror was born in Granite City, Illinois. She studied mathematics at Southern Illinois University Edwardsville, earning a bachelor's degree there in 1988 and a master's degree in 1992. She earned her Ph.D. in industrial engineering from Arizona State University in 1998, and returned to Arizona State as a faculty member in 2005. She was the editor of Quality Engineering from 2011 to 2013, and chaired the Section on Quality and Productivity of the American Statistical Association for 2008.

== Books ==
Borror was the author of

- The ASQ CQE Study Guide (with Sarah E. Burke, American Society for Quality, 2016)
- Advanced Statistical Quality Control (with Murat Kulahci, John Wiley & Sons, 2009)
- Design and Analysis of Gauge R&R Studies (with Richard K. Burdick and Douglas C. Montgomory, SIAM and ASA, 2005)
- Probability and Statistics in Engineering (with William W. Hines, Douglas C. Montgomery, and David M. Goldsman, 2003)

She was also the editor of The Certified Quality Engineer Handbook (3rd ed., American Society for Quality, 2009).

== Awards and honors ==
Borror became a Fellow of the American Statistical Association in 2011, and was also a fellow of the American Society for Quality. In 2015, Arizona State named her an ASU Foundation Professor. She won the Shewhart Medal in 2016.
