= Dexter, Kansas =

City in Cowley County, Kansas

- City
- Location within Cowley County and Kansas

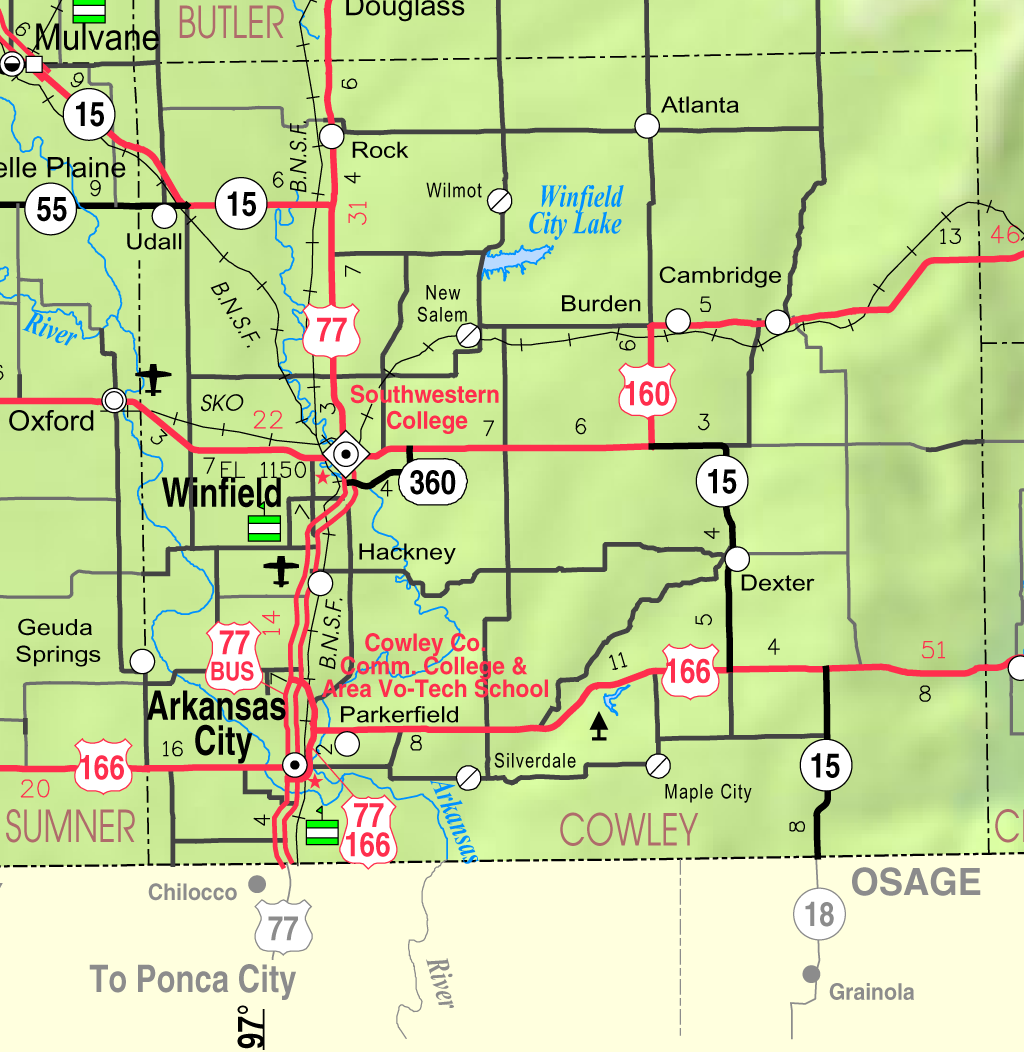
- KDOT map of Cowley County (legend)
- Coordinates: 37°10′46″N 96°42′58″W
- Country: United States
- State: Kansas
- County: Cowley
- Founded: 1870
- Platted: 1875
- Incorporated: 1884

Area
  - Total: 0.28 sq mi (0.72 km^{2})
  - Land: 0.28 sq mi (0.72 km^{2})
  - Water: 0 sq mi (0.00 km^{2})
- Elevation: 1,188 ft (362 m)

Population (2020)
  - Total: 224
  - Density: 810/sq mi (310/km^{2})
- Time zone: UTC-6 (CST)
  - Summer (DST): UTC-5 (CDT)
- ZIP Code: 67038
- Area code: 620
- FIPS code: 20-17925
- GNIS ID: 2394531

Dexter is a city in Cowley County, Kansas, United States. As of the 2020 census, the population of the city was 224.

== History ==
The first post office at Dexter was established in July, 1870.

Platted in 1875, Dexter is named for a trotting horse belonging to Robert Bonner of New York.

Early in the 20th century, Dexter became the focus of research that would confirm the existence of an abundance of naturally occurring and readily available helium. In May 1903, a newly drilled natural gas well was found to contain a nonflammable gas. Researchers at the University of Kansas found the "Dexter gas" contained only 15 percent methane and 72 percent nitrogen, causing the gas to be nonflammable. In addition they discovered helium within an "inert residue" in the gas and, after expanding their research to other wells throughout Kansas, Missouri, and Oklahoma, published a paper in 1907 saying that helium could be extracted from natural gas. Helium did not have any practical applications at the time, but by 1917 the federal government was sponsoring extensive research into the possibility of using helium in airships.

== Geography ==
According to the United States Census Bureau, the city has a total area of 0.29 square miles (0.75 km^{2}), all land.

=== Climate ===
The climate in this area is characterized by hot, humid summers and generally mild to cool winters. According to the Köppen Climate Classification system, Dexter has a humid subtropical climate, abbreviated "Cfa" on climate maps.

== Demographics ==
Historical population
Census	Pop.	Note	%±
1880	146		—
1890	371		154.1%
1900	380		2.4%
1910	512		34.7%
1920	497		−2.9%
1930	484		−2.6%
1940	424		−12.4%
1950	354		−16.5%
1960	291		−17.8%
1970	286		−1.7%
1980	366		28.0%
1990	320		−12.6%
2000	364		13.8%
2010	278		−23.6%
2020	224		−19.4%
U.S. Decennial Census

=== 2020 census ===
The 2020 United States census counted 224 people, 94 households, and 63 families in Dexter. The population density was 808.7 per square mile (312.2/km^{2}). There were 102 housing units at an average density of 368.2 per square mile (142.2/km^{2}). The racial makeup was 91.96% (206) white or European American (91.96% non-Hispanic white), 0.0% (0) black or African-American, 0.89% (2) Native American or Alaska Native, 0.0% (0) Asian, 0.0% (0) Pacific Islander or Native Hawaiian, 0.0% (0) from other races, and 7.14% (16) from two or more races. Hispanic or Latino of any race was 0.45% (1) of the population.

Of the 94 households, 31.9% had children under the age of 18; 54.3% were married couples living together; 26.6% had a female householder with no spouse or partner present. 29.8% of households consisted of individuals and 19.1% had someone living alone who was 65 years of age or older. The average household size was 4.0 and the average family size was 4.6. Those with a bachelor's degree or higher were estimated to be 23.7% of the population.

25.4% of the population was under the age of 18, 5.8% from 18 to 24, 16.5% from 25 to 44, 31.2% from 45 to 64, and 21.0% who were 65 years of age or older. The median age was 48.0 years. For every 100 females, there were 113.3 males. For every 100 females ages 18 and older, there were 106.2 males.

The 2016–2020 5-year American Community Survey estimates show that the median household income was $45,703 (with a margin of error of +/- $9,968) and the median family income was $47,188 (+/- $9,760). Females had a median income of $36,143 (+/- $649). The median income for those above 16 years old was $30,250 (+/- $24,274). Approximately, 8.0% of families and 10.0% of the population were below the poverty line, including 18.2% of those under the age of 18 and 0.0% of those ages 65 or over.

=== 2010 census ===
As of the census of 2010, there were 278 people, 105 households, and 77 families residing in the city. The population density was 958.6 inhabitants per square mile (370.1/km^{2}). There were 128 housing units at an average density of 441.4 per square mile (170.4/km^{2}). The racial makeup of the city was 95.3% White, 3.6% Native American, 0.4% Pacific Islander, and 0.7% from two or more races. Hispanic or Latino of any race were 0.7% of the population.

There were 105 households, of which 32.4% had children under the age of 18 living with them, 58.1% were married couples living together, 9.5% had a female householder with no husband present, 5.7% had a male householder with no wife present, and 26.7% were non-families. 23.8% of all households were made up of individuals, and 13.3% had someone living alone who was 65 years of age or older. The average household size was 2.36 and the average family size was 2.78.

The median age in the city was 47.4 years. 20.5% of residents were under the age of 18; 6.8% were between the ages of 18 and 24; 19.8% were from 25 to 44; 27.1% were from 45 to 64; and 25.9% were 65 years of age or older. The gender makeup of the city was 47.8% male and 52.2% female.

=== 2000 census ===
According to the census of 2000, there were 364 people, 119 households, and 81 families residing in the city. The population density was 1,309.4 inhabitants per square mile (505.6/km^{2}). There were 133 housing units at an average density of 478.4 per square mile (184.7/km^{2}). The racial makeup of the city was 92.03% White, 0.27% African American, 5.22% Native American, 0.82% from other races, and 1.65% from two or more races. Hispanic or Latino of any race were 1.10% of the population.

There were 119 households, out of which 38.7% had children under the age of 18 living with them, 59.7% were married couples living together, 5.9% had a female householder with no husband present, and 31.1% were non-families. 25.2% of all households were made up of individuals, and 10.1% had someone living alone who was 65 years of age or older. The average household size was 2.73 and the average family size was 3.43.

In the city, the population was spread out, with 28.0% under the age of 18, 6.3% from 18 to 24, 26.6% from 25 to 44, 20.6% from 45 to 64, and 18.4% who were 65 years of age or older. The median age was 38 years. For every 100 females, there were 87.6 males. For every 100 females age 18 and over, there were 83.2 males.

The median income for a household in the city was $32,656, and the median income for a family was $39,286. Males had a median income of $25,536 versus $18,125 for females. The per capita income for the city was $12,615. About 14.1% of families and 16.4% of the population were below the poverty line, including 23.4% of those under age 18 and 6.9% of those age 65 or over.

== Area events ==
- Blackdog Festival, celebrates the historic Black Dog Trail, also known as the Great Osage Trail, created by Osage Indian natives.

== Area attractions ==
- The "Oh Henry!" Candy Bar was invented by a man named Tom Henry of Arkansas City, whose family ran a small candy factory on route K-15 in Dexter called "Henry's Candies". The factory sold "Momma Henry" bars, which are near identical to the original "Oh Henry!" candy bar. The candy factory closed down in 2024.
- Cowley Lake Waterfall

== Education ==
The community is served by Dexter USD 471 public school district.

== Notable people ==
- Ellis R. Ott (died 1981), statistician and college professor

== See also ==
- Lighthouse Library
