= Vijayan Nair =

American statistician

Vijayan N. Nair
- Education: University of Malaya; University of California, Berkeley
- Occupation: Statistician
- Known for: Engineering Statistics, Reliability, Design and Analysis of Experiments, Quality Improvement
- Spouse: Corinne Nair
- Scientific career
- Workplaces: University of Michigan
- Doctoral advisor: Kjell Doksum

Vijayan (Vijay) N. Nair is currently Head of the Statistical Learning and Advanced Computing Group in Corporate Model Risk at Wells Fargo. He was Donald A. Darling Collegiate Professor of Statistics and Professor of Industrial and Operations Engineering at the University of Michigan, Ann Arbor from 1993 to 2017. He served as Chair of the Statistics Department at Michigan from 1998 to 2010 (sabbatical in 2003–04). Vijay was instrumental in launching the Michigan Institute for Data Science (MIDAS) and was recognized as a Distinguished Scientist by MIDAS. Prior to joining Michigan, he spent 15 years as a research scientist in the Mathematical Sciences Research Center at Bell Laboratories in New Jersey.

Vijay received his undergraduate degree in Economics from the University of Malaya, Malaysia and his PhD in Statistics from the University of California, Berkeley. He has published on a wide range of topics in statistical methodology and inference, engineering statistics, network tomography, reliability, design and analysis of experiments, behavioral intervention, and quality Improvement. His current research interests include risk modeling and machine learning.

== Professional recognition ==
Vijay served as President of the International Statistical Institute from 2013 to 2015 and President of the International Society for Business and Industrial Statistics during 2011–2013. He has been elected as Fellow of American Statistical Association, Institute of Mathematical Statistics, American Society for Quality and American Association for the Advancement of Science. He was co-editor-in-chief of the International Statistical Review from 2010 to 2015 and 1994 to 1998. He was also editor of Technometrics from 1990 to 1992. He was the Gosset Lecturer at the World Statistics Congress in Marrakech in 2017, the Deming Lecturer at the Joint Statistical Meetings in 2013, the Isabel Loutit Lecturer at the Statistical Society of Canada Meetings in 2008, and the Youden Memorial Lecturer at the Fall Technical Conference in 2007. Vijay served as Chair of the Board of Trustees of the National Institute of Statistical Sciences from 2004 to 2008. The conference "From Industrial Statistics to Data Science" was held during October 1–3, 2015 in Ann Arbor to recognize his contributions. He was one of five 2023 recipients of the American Statistical Association Founders Award for distinguished service to the association.
