= Wilks Memorial Award =

Award by the American Statistical Association

- Awarded for: Outstanding contributions to statistics
- Country: United States
- Presented by: American Statistical Association
- First award: 1964
- Website: https://www.amstat.org/ASA/Your-Career/Awards/Samuel-S-Wilks-Memorial-Award.aspx

The Wilks Memorial Award is awarded by the American Statistical Association to recognize outstanding contributions to statistics. It was established in 1964 and is awarded yearly. It is named in memory of the statistician Samuel S. Wilks. The award consists of a medal, a citation and a cash honorarium that was set at US$1,000 in 2008 and increases annually.

It is separate from the The Wilks Award for Contributions to Statistical Methodologies in Army Research, Development, and Testing that is presented by the United States Army.

== Recipients ==
- 1964 Frank E. Grubbs
- 1965 John W. Tukey
- 1966 Leslie E. Simon
- 1967 William G. Cochran
- 1968 Jerzy Neyman
- 1969 W. J. Youden
- 1970 George W. Snedecor
- 1971 Harold F. Dodge
- 1972 George E.P. Box
- 1973 Herman Otto Hartley
- 1974 Cuthbert Daniel
- 1975 Herbert Solomon
- 1976 Solomon Kullback
- 1977 Churchill Eisenhart
- 1978 William Kruskal
- 1979 Alexander M. Mood
- 1980 W. Allen Wallis
- 1981 Holbrook Working
- 1982 Frank Proschan
- 1983 W. Edwards Deming
- 1984 Z. W. Birnbaum
- 1985 Leo A. Goodman
- 1986 Frederick Mosteller
- 1987 Herman Chernoff
- 1988 Theodore W. Anderson
- 1989 C. R. Rao
- 1990 Bradley Efron
- 1991 Ingram Olkin
- 1992 Wilfrid Dixon
- 1993 Norman L. Johnson
- 1994 Emanuel Parzen
- 1995 Donald Rubin
- 1996 Erich L. Lehmann
- 1997 Leslie Kish
- 1998 David O. Siegmund
- 1999 Lynne Billard
- 2000 Stephen Fienberg
- 2001 George C. Tiao
- 2002 Lawrence D. Brown
- 2003 David L. Wallace
- 2004 Paul Meier
- 2005 Roderick J. A. Little
- 2006 Marvin Zelen
- 2007 Colin L. Mallows
- 2008 Scott Zeger
- 2009 Lee-Jen Wei
- 2010 Pranab K. Sen
- 2011 Nan Laird
- 2012 Peter Gavin Hall
- 2013 Kanti Mardia
- 2014 Madan Lal Puri
- 2015 James O. Berger
- 2016 David Donoho
- 2017 Wayne Fuller
- 2018 Peter J. Bickel
- 2019 Alan E. Gelfand
- 2020 Malay Ghosh
- 2021 Sallie Ann Keller
- 2022 Jessica Utts
- 2023 Jeremy M. Taylor
- 2024 Joseph G. Ibrahim
- 2025 James J. Cochran
