= Jianjun Shi =

Chinese-born American engineer and professor

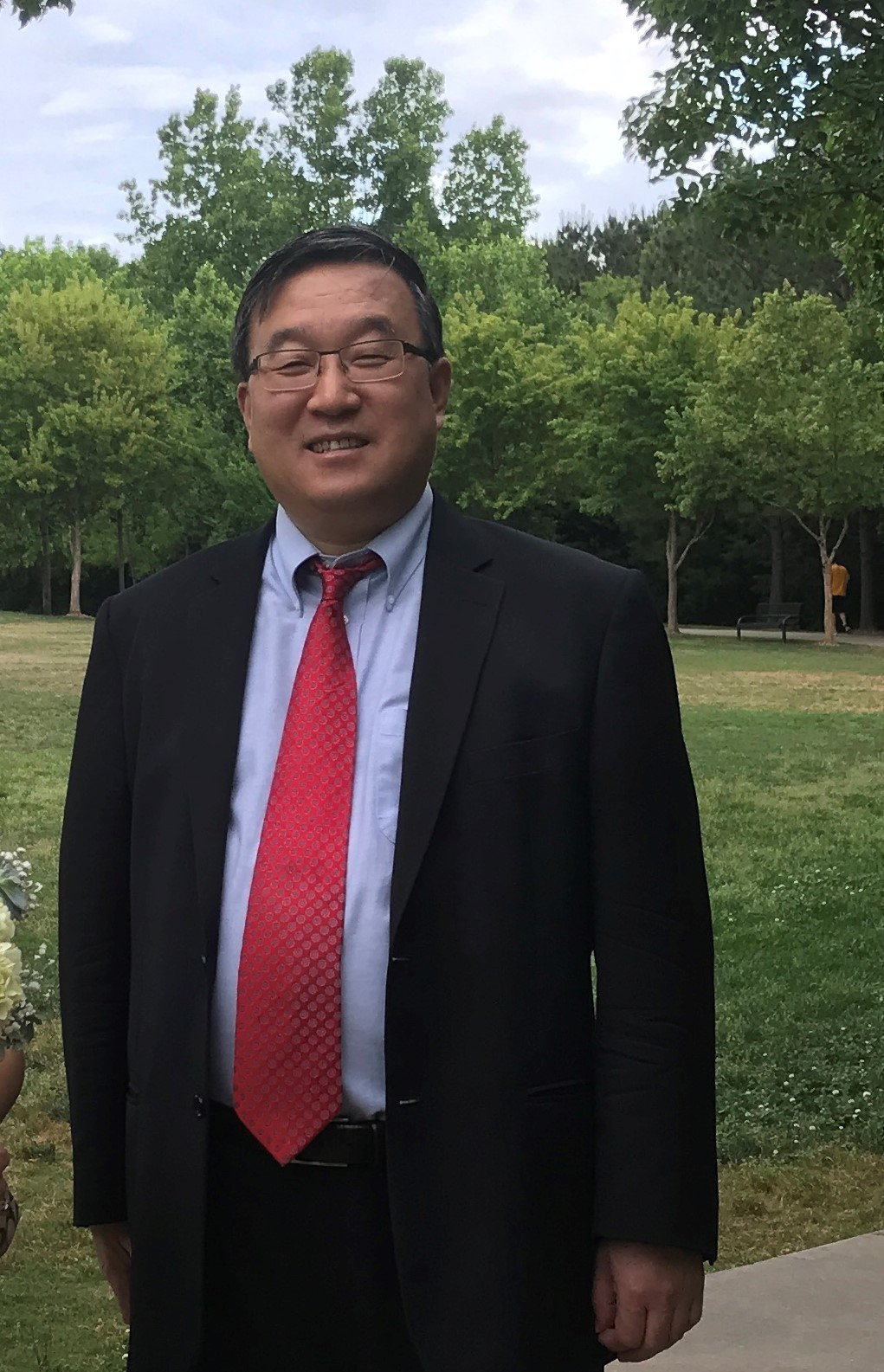
- Shi in 2018
- Born: Shijiazhuang, Hebei, China
- Education: Beijing Institute of Technology (B.S. EE., 1984, M.S., 1987); University of Michigan (PH.D., 1992)
- Scientific career
- Fields: Manufacturing
- Workplaces: University of Michigan (1992–2007); Georgia Institute of Technology (2008– )
- Doctoral advisor: Shien-Ming (Sam) Wu

Jianjun "Jan" Shi (Chinese: 史建军; pinyin: Shǐ Jiànjūn) is a Chinese-born American engineer and the Carolyn J. Stewart Chair and Professor in the H. Milton Stewart School of Industrial and Systems Engineering. He also works at the George W. Woodruff School of Mechanical Engineering at the Georgia Institute of Technology. He was elected as a member into the National Academy of Engineering in 2018 for the "development of data fusion-based quality methods and their implementation in multistage manufacturing systems".

== Biography ==
Shi was born in Shijiazhuang, Hebei, China. He received his B.S. and M.S. in Electrical Engineering from Beijing Institute of Technology in 1984 and 1987, and his Ph.D. in Mechanical Engineering from the University of Michigan in 1992 under the supervision of Shien-Ming (Sam) Wu. Prior to joining Georgia Institute of Technology in 2008, he was the G. Lawton and Louise G. Johnson Professor of Engineering at the University of Michigan.

== Research and education ==
Dr. Shi is a pioneer in the development and application of data fusion for quality improvements. His methodologies integrate system informatics, advanced statistics, and control theory for the design and operational improvements of manufacturing and service systems by fusing engineering systems models with data science methods. Shi has advised 38 Ph.D. graduates, 26 of whom have joined an academic industrial engineering department as a faculty member. Among them, seven received National Science Foundation Career Awards and one received the National Science PECASE Award.

Shi has published one book “Stream of Variation Modeling and Analysis for Multistage Manufacturing Processes”, and more than 180 papers. Shi has served as the Editor-in-Chief of the IISE Transactions (2017-2020), the flagship journal of the Institute of Industrial and Systems Engineers.

== Awards and honors ==
- Deming Lecturer Award (2025)
- George Box Medal (2022)
- Fellow of Society of Manufacturing Engineers (SME) (2021)
- S.M. Wu Research Implementation Award (2021)
- ASQ Walter Shewhart Medal from the American Society for Quality (2021)
- ASQ Brumbaugh Award from the American Society for Quality (2019)
- Member of National Academy of Engineering (NAE) (2018)
- The Horace Pops Medal Award (2018)
- IISE David F. Baker Distinguished Research Award (2016)
- Academician of the International Academy for Quality
- IISE Albert G. Holzman Distinguished Educator Award (2011)
- Fellow of Institute for Operations Research and the Management Sciences (INFORMS) (2008)
- Fellow of the Institute of Industrial and Systems Engineers (IISE) (2007)
- Fellow of American Society of Mechanical Engineers (ASME) (2007)
- Monroe-Brown Foundation Research Excellence Award (2007)
- National Science Foundation Career Award (1996)
