= Donald Marquardt =

American mathematician (1929–1997)

Donald W. Marquardt (March 13, 1929, New York City – July 5, 1997, New Castle, Delaware) was an American statistician, the rediscoverer of the Levenberg–Marquardt nonlinear least squares fitting algorithm.

Marquardt was educated at Columbia University with bachelor's degree in 1950 in physics and mathematics and at the University of Delaware with master's degree in 1956 in mathematics and statistics. Marquardt joined DuPont in 1953 and worked there for 39 years. He also founded and managed the DuPont Quality Management & Technology Center. In 1963 he published his famous paper "algorithm for least-squares estimation of nonlinear problems" in SIAM journal. Marquardt developed his algorithm to solve fitting nonlinear chemical models to laboratory data. In 1975 he was elected as a Fellow of the American Statistical Association.

As manager of the DuPont Applied Statistics Group, he led development of the Product Quality Management methodology and computer systems that implemented the company's continuous improvement initiatives from the mid-1970s to the late 1990s. He won the Shewhart Medal in 1986.

In 1991, he established his own company, Donald W. Marquardt and Associates, which provides consulting and training in quality management, quality assurance, ISO 9000 standards, applied statistics, strategic planning and organizational change.

He died from a heart attack at the age of 68.

== Awards and achievements ==
- President of the American Statistical Association (1986)
- Elected member of the International Statistical Institute.
- Leader of the U.S. delegation to the ISO 9000 International Quality Standard writing group.
- American Society for Quality (ASQ) Shewhart Medal (1987)
- American Statistical Association Statistician of the Year (1993–94)
- American Statistical Association Founders Award (1995)
- American National Standards Institute Meritorious Service Award
