= Dennis K.J. Lin =

Taiwanese-American statistician

- Born: Taiwan, ROC
- Education: National Tsing-Hua University (BS); University of Wisconsin-Madison (PhD)
- Scientific career
- Workplaces: Purdue University; Pennsylvania State University

Dennis K.J. Lin is a Taiwanese-American statistician who works in design of experiments, quality assurance, data mining, and data science.

== Education and early life ==
He was born in Taiwan and obtained a bachelor's degree (in mathematics) in June 1981 from National Tsing-Hua University, ROC. He received a Ph.D. (in statistics) in December 1988 from the University of Wisconsin-Madison, with a minor in computer science.

== Career and research ==
From 1995 to 2020, Lin worked as a statistician for Pennsylvania State University, and became a university distinguished professor. Since July 2020 - August 2023, he has been the head at the department of statistics at Purdue University and currently serves as a distinguished professor of statistics in Purdue.

Lin published a total of over 200 papers in professional journals.

Lin is known for his contributions to the design of experiments, industrial statistics and Ghost Data.

== Professional fellowships ==
- Elected Fellow, Institute of Mathematical Statistics (2013)
- Elected Fellow, American Society for Quality (2006)
- Elected Fellow, American Statistical Association (1998)
- Elected Member, International Statistical Institute (1994)
- (Elected) Fellow, Royal Statistical Society (1988)

== See also ==
- Quality assurance
- Design of experiments
