= John F. MacGregor =

Canadian statistician and chemical engineer

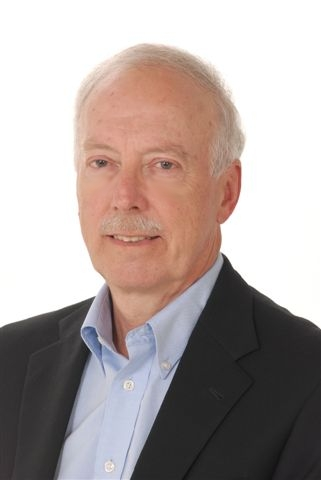
- Awards: Shewhart Medal (1997)
- Scientific career
- Doctoral advisor: George E. P. Box

John Frederick MacGregor (born 1943 in Ontario, Canada) is a statistician whose work in the field of statistical process control has received significant recognition. His pioneering work was in the area of latent variable/multivariate analysis (MVA) methods (principal components analysis and partial least squares) applied to industrial processes.

== Contributions ==
- A latent variable framework for Model Predictive Control (MPC).
- Latent variable modeling, monitoring and control of batch processes.
- Differential Geometric control of polymer processes.
- Introduction of Stochastic states in the Extended Kalman Filter for integral action.
- Multivariate image analysis
- Model-based product development

== Education ==
He received his PhD degree in Statistics, and his M.S. degrees in both Statistics and in Chemical Engineering from the University of Wisconsin–Madison, and his Bachelor of Engineering degree from McMaster University in Canada. At Wisconsin, he worked under the statistician George EP Box.

== Honours and awards ==
MacGregor is a Fellow of the American Statistical Association, and has received many awards for his work in applied statistics and chemometrics, among them, the prestigious Shewhart Medal and the W.G. Hunter Award from the American Society for Quality, and the Herman Wold Medal from the Swedish Chemical Society. The Canadian Journal of Chemical Engineering dedicated the October 2008 edition to MacGregor in celebration of his 65th birthday. Industrial & Engineering Chemistry Research published a Festschrift in his honour in September 2013, in honour of his 70th birthday.

He holds the title of "Distinguished University Professor" (the highest honor awarded to faculty at McMaster University) as well as the Dofasco Chair in Process Automation and Information Technology at McMaster University. He is a cofounder of the McMaster Advanced Control Consortium that is sponsored by many international companies.

== Industrial and Entrepreneurial Activities ==
In 2002, MacGregor established ProSensus Inc., a company that he spun off from the McMaster Advanced Control Consortium and incorporated in 2004. MacGregor continues to consult and teach courses through ProSensus.
