= C. F. Jeff Wu =

American statistician

- 吳建福
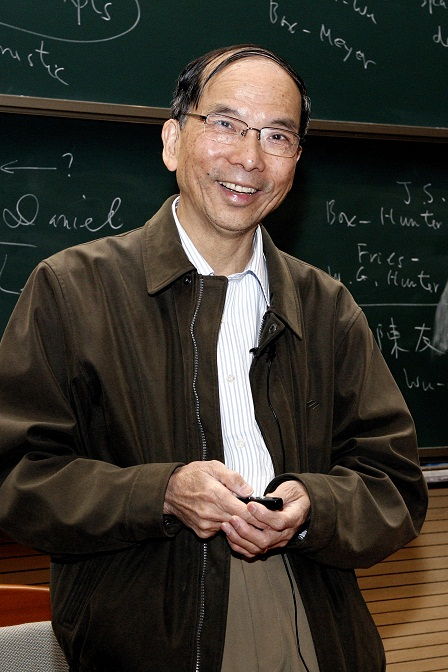
- Born: 1949 (age 76–77); Hsinchu, Taiwan
- Education: National Taiwan University (BS); University of California, Berkeley (PhD)
- Known for: EM convergence proof, resampling methods, industrial statistics, design and analysis of experiments
- Awards: COPSS Presidents' Award, Shewhart Medal, R. A. Fisher Lectureship, Brumbaugh Award
- Scientific career
- Fields: Statistics
- Workplaces: Chinese University of Hong Kong, Shenzhen, Georgia Institute of Technology, University of Michigan, University of Waterloo, University of Wisconsin-Madison
- Thesis: Contributions to Optimization Theory with Applications to Optimal Design of Experiments (1976)
- Doctoral advisor: Peter J. Bickel

Chien-Fu Jeff Wu (Chinese: 吳建福; born 1949) is a Taiwanese-American statistician. He is the X. Q. Deng Presidential Chair Professorship in the School of Data Science at the Chinese University of Hong Kong, Shenzhen. He is known for his work on the convergence of the EM algorithm, resampling methods such as the bootstrap and jackknife, and industrial statistics, including design of experiments, and robust parameter design (Taguchi methods).

== Biography ==
Born in Taiwan, Wu earned a B.S. in mathematics from National Taiwan University in 1971, and a Ph.D. in statistics from the University of California, Berkeley, in 1976. He has been a faculty member at the University of Wisconsin, Madison (1977–1988), the University of Waterloo (1988–1993; GM-NSERC chair in quality and productivity), the University of Michigan (1995–2003; chair of Department of Statistics 1995–98; H.C. Carver professor of statistics, 1997–2003) and the Coca-Cola Chair in Engineering Statistics and Professor in the H. Milton Stewart School of Industrial and Systems Engineering at the Georgia Institute of Technology (2003-2024). He has supervised more than 50 Ph.D. students and published around 185 peer-reviewed articles and two books.

He has received several awards, including the COPSS Presidents' Award in 1987, the Shewhart Medal in 2008, the COPSS R. A. Fisher Lectureship in 2011, and the Deming Lecturer Award in 2012. He gave the inaugural Akaike Memorial Lecture in 2016. He has been elected as a fellow of the American Statistical Association, the Institute of Mathematical Statistics, the American Society for Quality and the Institute for Operations Research and the Management Sciences. In 2000 he was elected as a member of Academia Sinica. In 2004, he was elected as a member of the National Academy of Engineering. He received the Shewhart Medal of the American Society for Quality and an honorary degree from the University of Waterloo in 2008. In 2012, Wu won the Wilks Award for Contributions to Statistical Methodologies in Army Research, Development, and Testing.

In 1985, in a lecture given to the Chinese Academy of Sciences in Beijing, he used the term Data Science for the first time as an alternative name for statistics. Later, in November 1997, he gave the inaugural lecture entitled "Statistics = Data Science?" for his appointment to the H. C. Carver Professorship at the University of Michigan. He popularized the term "data science" and advocated that statistics be renamed data science and statisticians data scientists. He also presented his lecture entitled "Statistics = Data Science?" as the first of his 1998 P.C. Mahalanobis Memorial Lectures. These lectures honor Prasanta Chandra Mahalanobis, an Indian scientist and statistician and founder of the Indian Statistical Institute.

In Mile, Yunnan, China, a conference was held in July 2014 celebrating Professor Wu's 65th birthday. In 2014 he gave the Bradley Lecture at the University of Georgia. In 2016 he was the inaugural recipient of the Akaike Memorial Lecture Award. In 2017 Jeff Wu received the George Box Medal from ENBIS. In 2020, Jeff Wu received Georgia Institute of Technology’s highest award given to a faculty member: the Class of 1934 Distinguished Professor Award. In the same year, he also got the Sigma Xi’s Monie A. Ferst Award which, since 1977, has honored science and engineering teachers who have inspired their students to significant research achievements. In 2020 he delivered the CANSSI/Fields Distinguished Lectures Series in Statistical Sciences.
