= Ronald Does =

Dutch mathematician (born 1955)

Ronald J. M. M. Does
- Born: January 13, 1955 (age 71); Haarlem, Netherlands
- Scientific career
- Fields: Statistics
- Workplaces: University of Amsterdam
- Doctoral advisor: Willem van Zwet

Ronaldus Joannes Michael Maria "Ronald" Does (born 13 January 1955 in Haarlem) is a Dutch mathematician, known for several contributions to statistics and Lean Six Sigma. His research interests include control charts, Lean Six Sigma, and the integration of industrial statistics in services and healthcare.

Since 1991 he has been holding a full-professorship in Industrial Statistics at the University of Amsterdam, first at its Korteweg-de Vries Institute for Mathematics, and since April 2009 at the department of Operations Management. In 2007 he has been appointed as fellow of the American Society for Quality and in 2014 as fellow of the American Statistical Association. He is the managing director and founder of the Institute for Business and Industrial Statistics of the University of Amsterdam. Since 2011 he has also been director of the Executive Programmes of the University of Amsterdam.

== Books ==
- "Lean Six Sigma Stap voor Stap" (2008, in Dutch)
- "Lean Six Sigma for Services and Healthcare" (2012)
