= George E. P. Box =

British statistician

George Box FRS
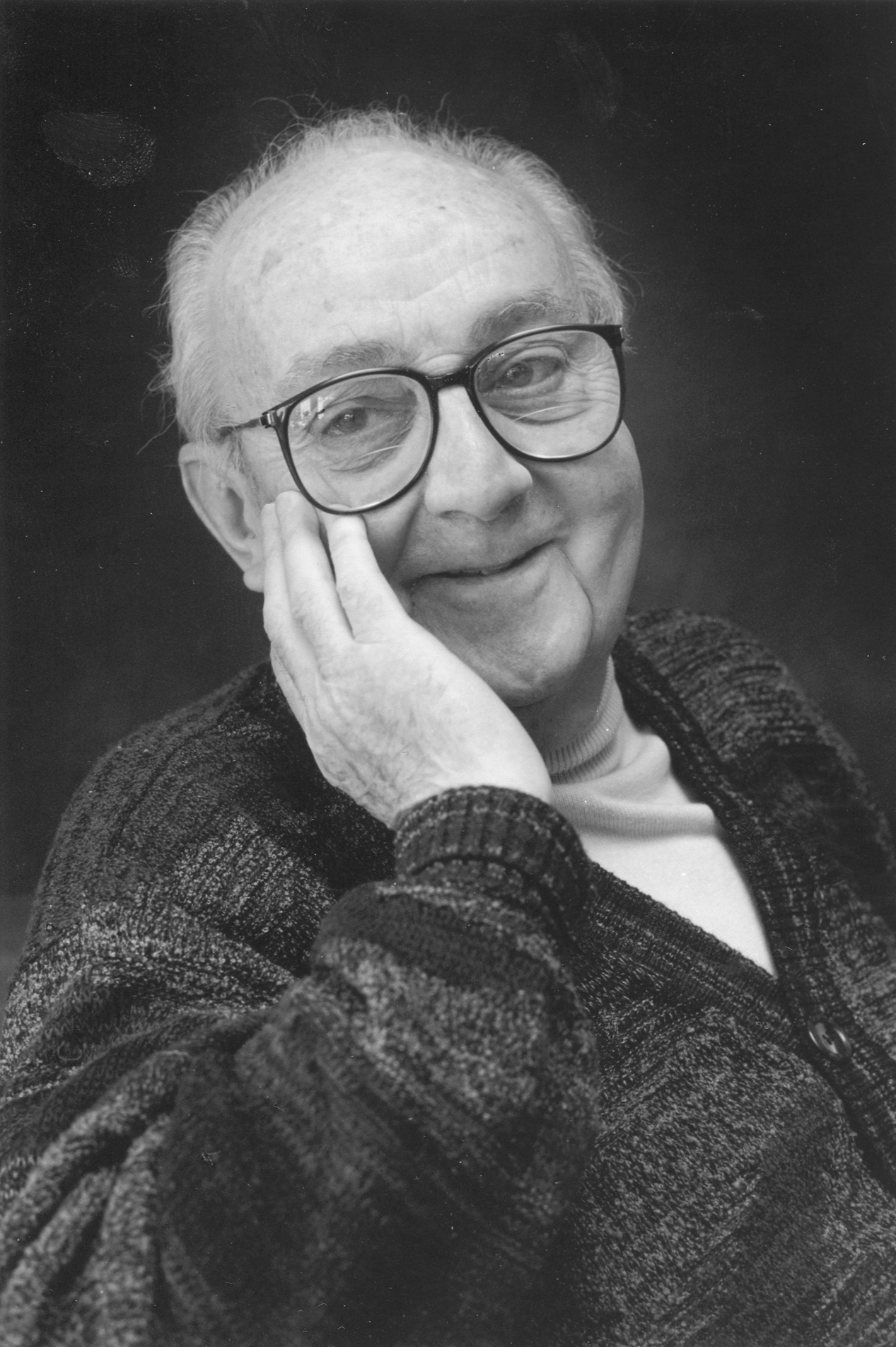
- Born: 18 October 1919; Gravesend, Kent, England
- Died: 28 March 2013 (aged 93); Madison, Wisconsin
- Education: University College London
- Known for: "All models are wrong"; Response-surface methodology; EVOP; q-exponential distribution; Box–Jenkins method; Box–Cox transformation; Box–Tidwell transformation; Box–Behnken design; Box–Cox distribution; Box–Muller transform; Box–Pierce test; Box's M test; Ljung–Box test
- Awards: Shewhart Medal (1968); Wilks Memorial Award (1972); R. A. Fisher Lectureship (1974); FRS (1985); Guy Medal (silver, 1964) (Gold, 1993); George Box Medal (2003)
- Scientific career
- Fields: Statistics
- Workplaces: ICI; Princeton University; University of Wisconsin–Madison
- Thesis: Departures from Independence and Homoskedasticity in the Analysis of Variance and Related Statistical Analysis (1953)
- Doctoral advisor: Egon Pearson; H. O. Hartley
- Doctoral students: John F. MacGregor; Greta M. Ljung; George C. Tiao

George Edward Pelham Box FRS (18 October 1919 – 28 March 2013) was a British statistician, who worked in the areas of quality control, time-series analysis, design of experiments, and Bayesian inference. He has been called "one of the great statistical minds of the 20th century". His quote "All models are wrong but some are useful" has been widely discussed.

== Education and early life ==
He was born in Gravesend, Kent, England. Upon entering university he began to study chemistry, but was called up for service before finishing. During World War II, he performed experiments for the British Army exposing small animals to poison gas. To analyze the results of his experiments, he taught himself statistics from available texts. After the war, he enrolled at University College London and obtained a bachelor's degree in mathematics and statistics. He received a PhD from the University of London in 1953, under the supervision of Egon Pearson and HO Hartley.

== Career and research ==
From 1948 to 1956, Box worked as a statistician for Imperial Chemical Industries (ICI). While at ICI, he took a leave of absence for a year and served as a visiting professor at North Carolina State University at Raleigh. He later went to Princeton University where he served as Director of the Statistical Research Group.

In 1960, Box moved to the University of Wisconsin–Madison to create the Department of Statistics. In 1980, he was named Vilas Research Professor of Statistics, which is the highest honor given to a member of the University of Wisconsin-Madison faculty. Box and Bill Hunter co-founded the Center for Quality and Productivity Improvement at the University of Wisconsin–Madison in 1985. Box officially retired in 1992, becoming an emeritus professor.

Box published books including Statistics for Experimenters (2nd ed., 2005), Time Series Analysis: Forecasting and Control (4th ed., 2008, with Gwilym Jenkins and Gregory C. Reinsel) and Bayesian Inference in Statistical Analysis. (1973, with George C. Tiao).

== Awards and honours ==
Box served as president of the American Statistical Association in 1978 and of the Institute of Mathematical Statistics in 1979. He received the Shewhart Medal from the American Society for Quality Control in 1968, the Wilks Memorial Award from the American Statistical Association in 1972, the R. A. Fisher Lectureship in 1974, the Guy Medal in Gold from the Royal Statistical Society in 1993, the Brumbaugh Award from the American Society for Quality in 1987, 1993, 1997, 2007, and 2010. Box was elected a member of the American Academy of Arts and Sciences in 1974 and a Fellow of the Royal Society (FRS) in 1985.

His name is associated with results in statistics such as Box–Jenkins models, Box–Cox transformations, Box–Behnken designs, and others. Additionally, Box famously wrote, in various books and papers, that "all models are wrong, but some are useful".

== Personal life ==
Box was married three times. In 1945, he married Jessie Ward, a sergeant in the Auxiliary Territorial Service. The two later divorced. He then married Joan Fisher, daughter of the British statistician Ronald Fisher. The two later collaborated on a biography of Ronald Fisher, published in 1978. After Fisher and Box divorced, he married Claire Louise Quist in 1985.

Box died on 28 March 2013. He was 93 years old.

== Selected publications ==
- Box, G.E.P, Cox, D.R. (1964) "An Analysis of Transformations ". Journal of the Royal Statistical Society. 26 (2): 211–252.
