= Gottfried E. Noether Awards =

The Gottfried Noether awards of the American Statistical Association are conferred annually. They honor the memory of Gottfried E. Noether, an early researcher in Nonparametric statistics. They originate from an endowment donated by Noether's wife and daughter, Emiliana and Monica Noether, with the mission to recognize eminent scholars in the field of nonparametric statistics.

There are two Noether awards each year. The Noether Distinguished Scholar Award goes to a senior researcher, whereas the Noether Early Career Scholar award is for an accomplished young researcher who obtained their PhD at most 8 years before. Both awards are handed out at the Joint Statistical Meetings each year, and come with a cash award of $5,000 for the senior version and $2,500 for the junior one. The awardees then present an invited lecture about their work.

== Past recipients of the Distinguished Scholar Award ==
Past recipients of the Distinguished Scholar Award are tabulated below

Year	Recipient	Institution(s)
2026	Runze Li	Pennsylvania State University
2025	Xuming He	Washington University in St. Louis
2024	Peter Rousseeuw	KU Leuven
2023	Tony Cai	Wharton School of the University of Pennsylvania
2022	Marc Hallin	Université libre de Bruxelles
2021	Regina Liu	Rutgers University
2020	Art Owen	Stanford University
2019	Michael R. Kosorok	University of North Carolina at Chapel Hill
2018	Jianqing Fan	Princeton University
2017	Hans-Georg Müller	University of California, Davis
2016	Jane-Ling Wang	University of California, Davis
2015	Willem van Zwet	Leiden University
2014	Raymond J. Carroll	Texas A&M University
2013	Jayaram Sethuraman	Florida State University
2012	Joseph Gastwirth	George Washington University
2011	Jon A. Wellner	University of Washington
2010	Jerome H. Friedman	Stanford University
2009	Grace Wahba	University of Wisconsin–Madison
2008	Madan Lal Puri	Indiana University Bloomington
2007	Peter Gavin Hall	University of Melbourne
2006	Bradley Efron	Stanford University
2005	Emanuel Parzen	Texas A&M
2004	Thomas P. Hettmansperger	Pennsylvania State University
2003	Myles Hollander	Florida State University
2002	Pranab K. Sen	University of North Carolina at Chapel Hill
2001	Robert V. Hogg	University of Iowa
2000	Erich Leo Lehmann	University of California, Berkeley

== Past recipients of the Early Career Scholar Award ==
Past recipients of the Early Career Scholar Award are tabulated below

Year	Recipient	Institution(s)
2026	Pragya Sur	Harvard University
2026	Arun Kumar Kuchibhotla	Carnegie Mellon University
2025	Song Mei	University of California, Berkeley
2025	Yuting Wei	University of Pennsylvania
2024	Edgar Dobriban	Wharton School
2024	Lucas Janson	Harvard University
2023	Chao Gao	University of Chicago
2023	Weijie Su	University of Pennsylvania
2022	Yen-Chi Chen	University of Washington
2021	Anru Zhang	Duke University
2020	Tracy Ke	Harvard University
2019	Matthew Reimherr	Pennsylvania State University
2018	Anirban Bhattacharya	Texas A&M University
2017	Eric B. Laber	Duke University
2016	Jing Lei	Carnegie Mellon University
2015	Han Liu	Northwestern University
2014	Arnab Maity	North Carolina State University
2013	Yingying Fan	University of Southern California
2012	Guang Cheng	University of California, Los Angeles
2011	Ying Wei	Columbia University Mailman School of Public Health
2010	Elizaveta Levina	University of Michigan
2009	Harrison H. Zhou	Yale University
2008	Donglin Zeng	University of North Carolina at Chapel Hill
2007	Davy Paindaveine	Université libre de Bruxelles
2006	Ciprian Crainiceanu	Johns Hopkins University
2005	Jeffrey S. Morris	University of Pennsylvania
2004	Gerda Claeskens	KU Leuven
2003	Yi Lin	University of Wisconsin–Madison
2002	Xihong Lin	Harvard University
2001	Rafael Irizarry	Harvard T.H. Chan School of Public Health

== See also ==
- Lists of science and technology awards
