= Vernon Chinchilli =

American biostatistician

Vernon M. Chinchilli (born March 12, 1952) is an American biostatistician and Distinguished Professor of Public Health Sciences at the Penn State College of Medicine, where he is also Chair of the Department of Public Health Sciences. He is also a professor of Statistics at Penn State University.

Chinchilli earned his Ph.D. in 1979 at the University of North Carolina at Chapel Hill. His dissertation, Rank Tests for Restricted Alternative Problems in Multivariate Analysis, was supervised by Pranab K. Sen.

In 1996, he co-authored a meta-analysis on the relationship between abortion and breast cancer along with multiple anti-abortion researchers, including Joel Brind. The meta-analysis concluded that abortion was associated with a 30% higher risk of breast cancer. Chinchilli told the New York Times that he believed that this increased risk is real, but acknowledged that it could be an artifact of bias. Chinchilli has described himself as pro-choice, and said in 2003 that despite the meta-analysis he co-authored, he does not think the issue had been resolved. He also said that "When we were talking about the conclusions, [Brind] wanted to make the strongest statements."
