= Gottfried E. Noether =

American statistician (1915–1991)

- Born: Gottfried Emanuel Noether; January 7, 1915; Karlsruhe, Grand Duchy of Baden, German Empire
- Died: August 22, 1991 (aged 76); Willimantic, Connecticut, U.S.
- Education: Ohio State University (BA, 1940); University of Illinois (MA, 1941); Columbia University (PhD, 1949)
- Scientific career
- Fields: Statistics
- Institutions: University of Connecticut; Boston University; New York University

Gottfried Emanuel Noether (German: [ˈnøːtɐ]; 7 January 1915 – 22 August 1991) was a German-born American statistician and educator; one of the third generation of a famous family of mathematicians: he was the son of Fritz Noether and nephew of Emmy Noether, the grandson of Max Noether, and brother of chemist Herman Noether. He died in Willimantic, Connecticut.

== Education and career ==
Noether was born into a Jewish family in Karlsruhe, Grand Duchy of Baden, German Empire in 1915. He later moved to Breslau (now Wrocław, Poland). The Nazi regime annulled his citizenship. He studied mathematics from 1935 to 1937 in Tomsk University and tried after his father's arrest to go to USA. With the help of his relatives he reached Sweden in 1938 and from there he travelled to the United States in 1939. There he earned a bachelor's degree (1940) and a master's degree (1941).

The following four years, during World War II, he served with US Army intelligence in England, France, and Germany. Noether was one of the Ritchie Boys. After the war, he earned a doctorate from Columbia University (1949).

He worked in academia for the rest of his career, beginning at New York University. He moved to Boston University in 1952 where he worked until he joined the faculty of the University of Connecticut in 1968. There, he eventually became chairman of the department of statistics. He retired in 1985.

== Statistician ==
Noether served on a statistical advisory committee for the United States Office of Management and Budget and as an associate editor of The American Statistician. He was a fellow of the American Statistical Association and the Institute of Mathematical Statistics.

As an expert on non-parametric statistics, he wrote over 50 articles and six books. He also wrote a brief biography of his father Fritz, who was executed in the Soviet Union in 1941.

== Honors ==
In 1999, the Gottfried E. Noether Awards were established to "recognize distinguished researchers and teachers and to support research in the field of nonparametric statistics." The initial recipients of the Gottfried E. Noether Senior Scholar Awards were Erich Leo Lehmann (2000), Robert V. Hogg (2001), and Pranab K. Sen (2002).

== Sources ==
- Hartford Courant (August 26, 1991). "Gottfried E. Noether". Hartford Courant. p. B6. (obituary)
- New York Times (August 27, 1991). "Gottfried Noether, 76, Educator in Statistics". New York Times. p. 22. (obituary)
- Noether, Gottfried E.; Marilynn Dueker (1990). Introduction to Statistics: The Nonparametric Way. Springer. ISBN 0-387-97284-6.
- Noether, Gottfried E. (September 1985). "Fritz Noether (1884–194?)". Integral Equations and Operator Theory. 8 (5): 573–576. doi:10.1007/BF01201702. S2CID 119721244.
- Parastaev, Andrei (March 1990). "Letter to the editor". Integral Equations and Operator Theory. 13 (2): 303–305. doi:10.1007/BF01193762. S2CID 189877218.
