= Choosing Children =

Choosing Children may refer to:

- The process of adoption
- Choosing Children, a 1985 documentary on lesbian parenthood produced by Debra Chasnoff
- Choosing Children: Genes, Disability, and Design, a 2006 book by Jonathan Glover
- Modern Dilemma : Choosing Children, a book on genetic engineering ethics by Sheila McLean
