= Lukacs Distinguished Professor =

The Lukacs Distinguished Professor chair was established in 1989 by the Department of Mathematics and Statistics at Bowling Green State University in honor of Eugene Lukacs, who came to Bowling Green with his colleagues Radha Laha and Vijay Rohatgi in 1972 to establish the doctoral program in statistics. Eugene Lukacs was Bowling Green's first Distinguished University Professor.

Each year an outstanding senior researcher in probability or statistics is invited to serve as the Eugene Lukacs Distinguished Visiting Professor during the academic year or a semester. The Lukacs Professors are invited based on their distinguished record of research in the application or theory of probability or statistics. The Lukacs professor typically collaborates with current faculty on research, participates in seminars and colloquia, and typically gives a graduate course or presents a series of related seminars. Lukacs Professors have organized Lukacs Symposia on a variety of topics in probability and statistics.

== Lukacs Distinguished Visiting Professors ==
Year	Professor	Institution
1990–1991	Gábor J. Székely	Budapest Institute of Technology, Hungary
1991–1992	Tim Robertson	University of Iowa
1992–1993	Samuel Kotz	University of Maryland
1992–1993	A. K. Md. Ehsanes Saleh	Carleton University, Ottawa, Ontario, Canada
1993–1994	Malay Ghosh	University of Florida
1993–1994	Anatoliy Skorokhod	Michigan State University
1994–1995	Abram Kagan	University of Maryland
1995–1996	Vyacheslav Girko	Ukrainian National Academy of Sciences
1996–1997	Pranab K. Sen	University of North Carolina
1997–1998	C. R. Rao	Pennsylvania State University
1998–1999	G. P. Patil	Pennsylvania State University
1999 Fall semester	Kanti V. Mardia	University of Leeds
1999 Fall semester	Raju Govindarajulu	University of Kentucky
2000 Spring semester	Nail Bakirov	Russian Academy of Sciences
2000 March 13–17	James Berger	Duke University
2000 Fall semester	Nozer Singpurwalla	George Washington University
2001 March 19–30	Norbert Henze	University of Karlsruhe, Germany
2001 April 1–5	Bradley Efron	Stanford University
2001 Fall semester	Yasunori Fujikoshi	Hiroshima University, Japan
2002 Spring semester	Hung T. Nguyen	New Mexico State University
2002 April 8–12	Peter J. Bickel	University of California, Berkeley
2003 March 28 – April 2	C. C. Heyde	Columbia University and Australian National University
2003 Spring semester	Damodar Shanbhag	University of Sheffield, U.K.
2003 Fall semester	Eugene Seneta	University of Sydney, Australia
2004 Spring semester	Leandro Pardo	Complutense University of Madrid, Spain
2005 Spring semester	N. Balakrishnan	McMaster University, Hamilton, Ontario, Canada
2006 May 30 – June 3	Ioannis Karatzas	Columbia University
2006 June 12 – June 15	Donald St. P. Richards	Pennsylvania State University
2007 Spring semester	M. S. Srivastava	University of Toronto, Ontario, Canada

Lukacs Symposia
Year	Lukacs Professor	Symposium	Title
1990–1991	Gabor J. Szekely	First Lukacs Symposium, March 1991	Probability and Statistics
1991–1992	Tim Robertson and Sam Kotz	Second Lukacs Symposium, March 1992	Order Restricted Statistical Inference
1992–1993	A. K. Md. Ehsanes Saleh	Third Lukacs Symposium – March 1993	Revival of Distributions and Regression Quantiles
1993–1994	Malay Ghosh and Anatoliy Skorokhod	Fourth Lukacs Symposium – March 1994	Infinite Dimensional Randomly Perturbed Dynamical Systems
1994–1995	Abram Kagan	Fifth Lukacs Symposium – March 1995	Statistical Inference in Semiparametric Models
1995–1996	Vyacheslav Girko	Sixth Lukacs Symposium – March 1996	Multidimensional Statistical Analysis and Theory of Random Matrices
1996–1997	Pranab K. Sen	Seventh Lukacs Symposium – April 1997	(1999) Robustness in Multivariate and Survival Models
1997–1998	C. R. Rao	Eighth Lukacs Symposium — April 1998	Statistics for the 21st Century
1998–1999	G. P. Patil	Ninth Lukacs Symposium — April 1999	Frontiers of Environmental and Ecological Statistics for the 21st Century
2005	N. Balakrishnan	April 15–16, 2005; May 14, 2005	"Statistical Distributions and Applications" "Ordered Data and Applications"

== See also ==
- List of statisticians
- History of statistics
