= Lukacs's proportion-sum independence theorem =

Theorem about independent random variables

In statistics, Lukacs's proportion-sum independence theorem is a result that is used when studying proportions, in particular the Dirichlet distribution. It is named after Eugene Lukacs.

== The theorem ==
If Y_{1} and Y_{2} are non-degenerate, independent random variables, then the random variables

$$W=Y_1+Y_2\text{ and }P = \frac{Y_1}{Y_1+Y_2}$$

are independently distributed if and only if both Y_{1} and Y_{2} have gamma distributions with the same scale parameter.

=== Corollary ===
Suppose Y_{i}, i = 1, ..., k be non-degenerate, independent, positive random variables. Then each of k − 1 random variables

$$P_i=\frac{Y_i}{\sum_{i=1}^k Y_i}$$

is independent of

$$W=\sum_{i=1}^k Y_i$$

if and only if all the Y_{i} have gamma distributions with the same scale parameter.
