= Malay Ghosh =

Statistician and professor

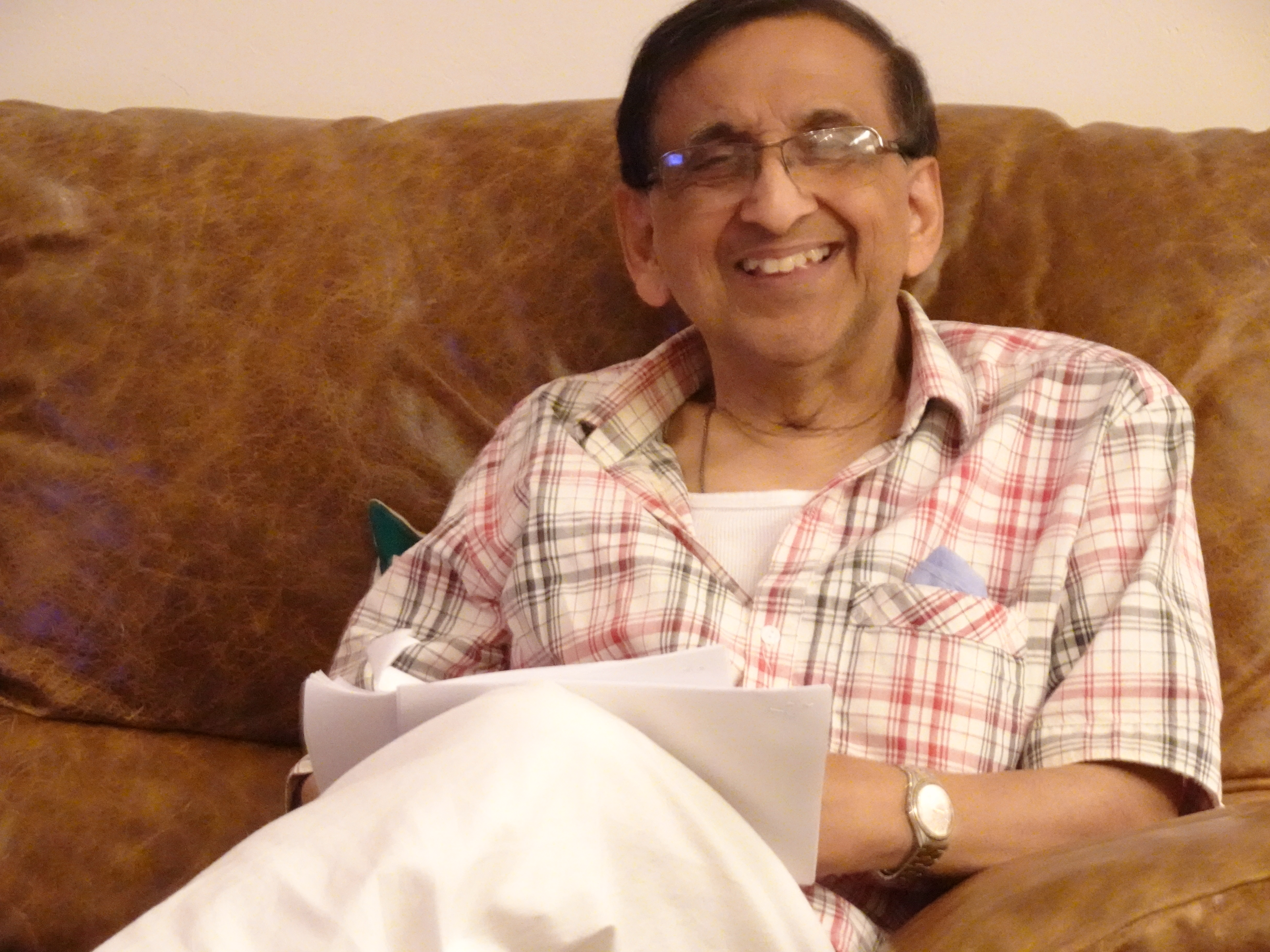
- Professor Malay Ghosh
- Born: 15 April 1944 (age 82); Calcutta, Bengal Province, British India
- Citizenship: United States
- Education: University of Calcutta (B.A., M.A.); University of North Carolina at Chapel Hill (Ph.D.)
- Scientific career
- Fields: Statistics
- Workplaces: University of Florida
- Doctoral advisor: Pranab K. Sen

Malay Ghosh (Bengali: মলয় ঘোষ) is an Indian-American statistician and currently a Distinguished Professor at the University of Florida. He obtained a B.S. in 1962 from the University of Calcutta, and subsequently a M.A. in 1964 from the University of Calcutta. Then he moved to the United States to pursue higher academic studies and obtained his Ph.D. degree in 1969 from the University of North Carolina at Chapel Hill, under the supervision of Pranab K. Sen

== Career ==
Ghosh was a faculty member at the Indian Statistical Institute in the 1970s before briefly joining Iowa State University. In 1982 he joined the University of Florida. Ghosh is well known for his research in nonparametric inference, sequential analysis, decision theory, Bayesian statistics and small-area estimation. As a recognition of his seminal contributions, Ghosh served from 1996 to 2001 in the United States Census Advisory Committee. He has co-authored two books and more than 250 research publications and is the advisor of over 40 Ph.D. students, including Nitis Mukhopadhyay, Parthasarathi Lahiri and Gauri Sankar Datta.

== Honors ==
In College Park, Maryland, a conference was held in May 2014 honoring Professor Ghosh.

- Samuel S. Wilks Memorial Award, 2020. American Statistical Association
- Elected Fellow of Institute of Mathematical Statistics
- Elected Fellow of American Statistical Association, 1984
- Lukacs Distinguished Professor 1993-1994
