= Gábor J. Székely =

Hungarian statistician and mathematician

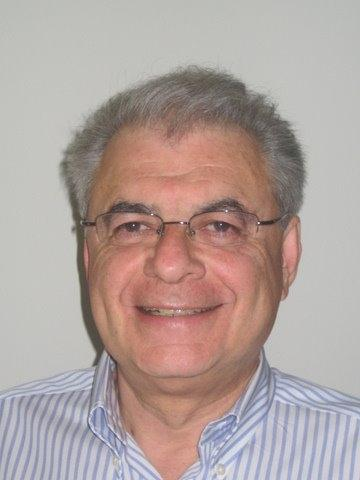
- Born: 4 February 1947 (age 79); Budapest, Hungary
- Education: Eötvös Loránd University
- Scientific career
- Fields: Mathematician, Probabilist, Statistician
- Workplaces: National Science Foundation; Hungarian Academy of Sciences
- Doctoral advisor: Alfréd Rényi

Gábor J. Székely (Hungarian pronunciation: [ˈseːkɛj]; born February 4, 1947, in Budapest) is a Hungarian-American statistician/mathematician best known for introducing energy statistics (E-statistics). Examples include: the distance correlation, which is a bona fide dependence measure, equals zero exactly when the variables are independent; the distance skewness, which equals zero exactly when the probability distribution is diagonally symmetric; the E-statistic for normality test; and the E-statistic for clustering.

Other important discoveries include the Hungarian semigroups, the location testing for Gaussian scale mixture distributions, the uncertainty principle of game theory, the half-coin which involves negative probability, and the solution of an old open problem of lottery mathematics: in a 5-from-90 lotto the minimum number of tickets one needs to buy to guarantee that at least one of these tickets has (at least) 2 matches is exactly 100.

== Life and career ==
Székely attended the Eötvös Loránd University, Hungary graduating in 1970. His first advisor was Alfréd Rényi. Székely received his Ph.D. in 1971 from Eötvös Loránd University, the Candidate Degree in 1976 under the direction of Paul Erdős and Andrey Kolmogorov, and the Doctor of Science degree from the Hungarian Academy of Sciences in 1986. During the years 1970-1995 he has worked as a Professor in Eötvös Loránd University at the Department of Probability Theory and Statistics.

Between 1985 and 1995 Székely was the first program manager of the Budapest Semesters in Mathematics. Between 1990 and 1997 he was the founding chair of the Department of Stochastics of the Budapest Institute of Technology (Technical University of Budapest) and editor-in-chief of Matematikai Lapok, the official journal of the János Bolyai Mathematical Society.

In 1989 Székely was visiting professor at Yale University, and in 1990-91 he was the first Lukacs Distinguished Professor in Ohio. Since 1995 he has been teaching at the Bowling Green State University at the Department of Mathematics and Statistics. Székely was academic advisor of Morgan Stanley, NY, and Bunge, Chicago, helped to establish the Morgan Stanley Mathematical Modeling Centre in Budapest (2005) and the Bunge Mathematical Institute (BMI) in Warsaw (2006) to provide quantitative analysis to support the firms' global business.

Since 2006 he is a Program Director of Statistics of the National Science Foundation, now retired. Székely is also Research Fellow of the Rényi Institute of Mathematics of the Hungarian Academy of Sciences.

For an informal biographical sketch see Conversations with Gábor J. Székely

== Awards ==
- Rollo Davidson Prize of Cambridge University (1988)
- Elected Fellow of the International Statistical Institute (1996)
- Elected Fellow of the American Statistical Association (2000)
- Elected Fellow of the Institute of Mathematical Statistics (2010)

== Books ==
- Székely, G. J. (1986) Paradoxes in Probability Theory and Mathematical Statistics, Reidel.
- Ruzsa, I. Z. and Székely, G. J. (1988) Algebraic Probability Theory, Wiley.
- Székely, G. J. (editor) (1995) Contests in Higher Mathematics, Springer.
- Rao, C.R. and Székely, G.J. (editors) (2000) Statistics For The 21st Century: Methodologies For Applications Of The Future (Statistics, Textbooks And Monographs), New York, Marcel Dekker.
- Guoyan Zheng, Shuo Li, Székely, G. J.(2017)Statistical Shape and Deformation Analysis, 1st Edition, Academic Press.
- Székely, G.J. and Rizzo, M.L. (2023) The Energy of Data and Distance Correlation, Chapman and Hall/CRC Press, Monographs on Statistics and Applied Probability Volume 171 .

== Selected works ==
- Székely, G. J. (1981–82) Why is 7 a mystical number? (in Hungarian) in: MIOK Évkönyv, 482-487, ed. Sándor Scheiber.
- Székely, G.J. and Ruzsa, I.Z. (1982) Intersections of traces of random walks with fixed sets, Annals of Probability 10, 132-136.
- Székely, G. J. and Ruzsa, I.Z. (1985) No distribution is prime, Z. Wahrscheinlichkeitstheorie verw. Geb. 70, 263-269.
- Székely, G. J. and Buczolich, Z. (1989) When is a weighted average of ordered sample elements a maximum likelihood estimator of the location parameter? Advances in Applied Mathematics 10, 439-456.
- Székely, G. J, Bennett, C.D., and Glass, A. M. W. (2004) Fermat's last theorem for rational exponents, The American Mathematical Monthly 11/4, 322-329.
- Székely, G. J. (2006) Student's t-test for scale mixtures. Lecture Notes Monograph Series 49, Institute of Mathematical Statistics, 10-18.
- Székely, G. J., Rizzo, M. L. and Bakirov, N. K. (2007) Measuring and testing independence by correlation of distances, The Annals of Statistics, 35, 2769-2794. arXiv:0803.4101
- Székely, G. J. and Rizzo, M.L. (2009) Brownian distance covariance, The Annals of Applied Statistics, 3/4, 1233-1308. arXiv:1010.0297
- Rizzo, M. L. and Székely, G. J. (2010) DISCO analysis: A nonparametric extension of analysis of variance, The Annals of Applied Statistics, 4/2, 1034-1055. arXiv:1011.2288
- Székely, G.J. and Rizzo, M.L. (2013) Energy statistics: statistics based on distances, Invited paper, Journal of Statistical Planning and Inference, 143/8, 1249-1272.
- Székely, G.J. and Rizzo, M.L. (2014) Partial distance correlation with methods for dissimilarities, The Annals of Statistics, 42/6, 2382-2412.
