= Americans United for Life =

Public interest law firm

- Abbreviation: AUL
- Formation: 1971
- Type: Nonprofit
- Purpose: To advance the human right to life in culture, law, and policy.
- Headquarters: Washington, D.C.
- Region served: United States
- Interim President: Kevin Tordoff
- Budget: $2.7 million
- Website: Americans United for Life

Americans United for Life (AUL) is an American anti-abortion law firm and advocacy group based in Washington, D.C. Founded in 1971, the group opposes abortion, euthanasia, assisted suicide, embryonic stem cell research, and certain contraceptive methods. The organization has led campaigns and been involved in judicial actions to prevent the passage and implementation of legislation that permits abortion, or may increase prevalence of abortion, including successfully defending the Hyde Amendment in the U.S. Supreme Court.

The group has been influential in the spread of so-called "Heartbeat" legislation across a number of American states.

== Early history and mission ==
AUL was founded in Washington, D.C. in 1971, two years prior to the nationwide legalization of abortion following the U.S. Supreme Court ruling in Roe v. Wade. The organization's first chairman of the board was Unitarian minister and then-Hollis Professor of Divinity at Harvard Divinity School, George Huntston Williams. Initially the group was involved in the intellectual debate surrounding abortion, but in 1975 the founders reorganized it into a legal organization. One of the group's early areas of focus was on building a case to persuade the Supreme Court to overturn its 1973 ruling. In 1987 the group outlined their plan to overturn Roe v. Wade in a book titled Abortion and the Constitution: Reversing Roe v. Wade Through the Courts. AUL was inspired by efforts of the National Association for the Advancement of Colored People in its strategy to impact legislation. The organization is a registered 501(c)(3) nonprofit, educational organization and public-interest law firm, with a specific interest in anti-abortion legislation. AUL's areas of legal interest include abortion, infanticide, euthanasia, stem cell research, and human cloning.

During the first half of the 1970s, Eugene Diamond of AUL argued that abortion was dangerous to women's health. Charles Rice, a professor at Fordham Law School, who was active in the AUL argued that "birth control fever" had infected American society. Early on, the organization did not oppose all forms of abortion. Some within the organization also supported a legal right to contraceptives. When the organization did not decide to condemn all forms of abortion, a number of members left and formed the United States Coalition for Life (USCL).

== Lobbying and litigation ==
AUL has supported bills to reduce the prevalence of abortion in the United States, including the Pregnant Women Support Act by United States Representative Lincoln Davis, which was introduced in 2006. In 1980, AUL played a key role in the Harris v. McRae decision by the U.S. Supreme Court, which upheld the Hyde Amendment restricting federal funding of Medicaid abortions only to cases of life endangerment (and, since 1994, rape or incest) and determined that states participating in Medicaid were not required to fund medically necessary abortions for which federal reimbursement was unavailable as a result of the Hyde Amendment. Professor Victor Rosenblum, a board member of AUL, argued the case before the Supreme Court and the AUL Legal Defense Fund represented the amendment's chief sponsor Rep. Henry Hyde and others.

The group has also been involved in legislative and judicial actions to prevent late-term abortions. Between 1997 and 2000, AUL worked with state attorneys general across the U.S. on partial birth abortion legislation. The group supported the passage of legislation in Virginia, banning a late-term abortion procedure. In 2006, the organization supported legislation that was proposed in 21 states, which aimed to require that doctors who perform late-term abortions inform their patients that the fetus might feel pain during the procedure. AUL vice president Daniel McConchie stated that the aim of the proposals was "humanizing the unborn". In 2007, the organization was involved in a Supreme Court case in which it helped to uphold the 2003 federal ban on partial-birth abortions.

== Model legislation ==
AUL writes model legislation every year and makes it available on the web for state legislators and others involved in the policy process. The model legislation is also included in the organization's annual guidebook, Defending Life, which is provided to state legislators. The organization developed model legislation for state laws requiring that either a parent or doctor be informed before a minor's pregnancy is terminated. In addition, the organization developed language for state laws requiring doctors to advise patients about the health risks from abortions. AUL has also drafted model legislation for states to ban assisted suicide, human cloning and specific kinds of stem cell research, and an opt-out provision for states objecting to the "abortion mandate" in the 2009 Patient Protection and Affordable Care Act.

In 2008, AUL produced the Pregnant Woman's Protection Act, a piece of model legislation aimed at providing greater rights to pregnant women to defend themselves from physical attack, especially in regard to domestic violence. In 2011, Mother Jones, a politically liberal magazine, published a report on Nebraska's Legislative Bill 232, a bill based on the Pregnant Women's Protection Act, that was critical of both the bill's wording and AUL's campaign to introduce the legislation. The report claimed that the bill's wording strongly advocates 'justifiable force', including homicide, against anyone that would be performing or seeking to perform legal abortion services. Mother Jones was also critical of similar bills, also based in part on the AUL model legislation for the Pregnant Woman's Protection Act, that were introduced in South Dakota and Iowa.

== Other issues ==
=== Abortion in cases of rape ===
On July 14, 2022, Catherine Glenn Foster, the organization's president, stated during U.S. House Judiciary Committee testimony: "If a 10-year-old became pregnant as the result of rape and it was threatening her life, that’s not an abortion," apparently referring to the case of a 27 year-old Ohio man charged with raping a 10-year-old girl who then traveled to Indiana to obtain an abortion after the Supreme Court's reversal of Roe v. Wade. Sarah Warbelow, legal director for the Human Rights Campaign, responded that Foster's remarks were "very significant disinformation," and further added, “An abortion is a procedure. It’s a medical procedure that individuals undergo for a wide range of circumstances, including because if they have been sexually assaulted, or raped in the case of the 10 year old."

=== Opposition to RU-486, Ella and gender testing ===
AUL has argued against the use of certain drugs including contraceptives that can be used to induce abortion, and also early-pregnancy gender detection tests. In 1995 the group filed a petition with the U.S. Food and Drug Administration (FDA), that demanded the agency apply the strictest possible standards when reviewing a drug used to induce abortions, RU-486. Later, in 2009 and 2010, the organization opposed the FDA approval of the contraceptive drug Ulipristal acetate (also known under the brand name ella). It argued that the pill caused abortions and campaigned for the FDA to not approve the drug for use in the U.S. The group has also voiced opposition towards an early-pregnancy gender detection kit called the Baby Gender Mentor. It stated that learning the gender at such an early point may lead some parents to terminate the pregnancy if they were hoping for a baby of the opposite sex to that indicated by the test. AUL claims that some women disappointed by the result of their test would find it easier to have an abortion if they get the results early.

=== Obamacare ===
AUL opposes the contraceptive mandate in Obamacare. During the 2009 debate over President Barack Obama's health care proposals, the organization's president at the time, Charmaine Yoest, met with representatives of the Obama administration to discuss "conscience protection" and the absence of "explicit language banning abortion funding and coverage" in the bill. AUL later came out in opposition to the Patient Protection and Affordable Care Act, and its affiliated legislative action group launched a targeted campaign in congressional districts of House members who supported the bill. In the two op-eds for the Wall Street Journal, Yoest argued that the health care bill would allow for federal funding of abortions and does not protect the rights of health care providers to not provide abortion services.

=== Supreme Court appointments ===
The organization has voiced opposition against Supreme Court justice appointments for judges who support abortion rights, including Ruth Bader Ginsburg and Stephen Breyer. In 2009, the organization was vocal in opposition of the nomination of Judge Sonia Sotomayor, arguing that she had a record of pro-abortion activism. AUL provided testimony before the Senate Judiciary Committee at the Congressional hearings to decide whether Sotomayor should be confirmed, as well as for then-Solicitor General Elena Kagan.

=== Online campaigns ===
AUL has produced online campaigns to engage Americans in the anti-abortion movement. In 2008, the organization created a website and online petition as part of a campaign against the Freedom of Choice Act (FOCA). As of September 2011, the petition had been signed by over 700,000 people. Other campaigns have included a "Virtual March for Life" of around 85,000 people, which it organized for members of the anti-abortion community unable to travel to Washington on the 37th anniversary of the Roe v. Wade Supreme Court decision. The virtual march aimed to provide individuals with a way to be involved in anti-abortion protests without traveling to Washington D.C., where the annual "March for Life" was taking place. The organization also created a Facebook page named "Support Tebow's Super Bowl Ad", to raise support for Tim Tebow's anti-abortion Super Bowl television commercial.

=== Actions against Planned Parenthood ===
In 2011, AUL's 501(c)(4) organization, AUL Action, formed a partnership with other organizations, Expose Planned Parenthood, to campaign for the United States Congress to end federal funding of Planned Parenthood. In an article in The Washington Times, the organization's counsel, Anna Franzonello, argued that the federal funding of Planned Parenthood effectively means that U.S. taxpayers are funding abortion procedures. She also voiced criticism of Planned Parenthood's advisory role to the government, particularly with regard to health care reform. The organization released a 174-page report on Planned Parenthood in July 2011, based on a study of 20 years detailing alleged abuses including misuse of federal funds and poor patient care. The report contributed to the House Energy and Commerce Committee's decision to begin investigating Planned Parenthood under Representative Cliff Stearns.

== Funding ==
In 2010, AUL received $45,000 from the Center to Protect Patient Rights (CPPR). AUL Action received $599,000 from CPPR in 2010, which was 39% of their budget.
