= Ying Wei =

Statistician

- Education: University of Illinois at Urbana-Champaign; University of Science and Technology of China
- Scientific career
- Fields: Statistics
- Workplaces: Columbia University

Ying Wei is a statistician and a professor of biostatistics in the Columbia University Mailman School of Public Health, working primarily on quantile regression, semiparametric models of longitudinal data, and their applications.

Wei graduated with a B.S. degree in 1998 and a master's degree in 2001 from the University of Science and Technology of China. In 2004, Wei earned her Ph.D. in statistics from the University of Illinois at Urbana–Champaign. Her dissertation, Longitudinal Growth Charts Based on Semiparametric Quantile Regression, was completed under the supervision of Xuming He. Since 2004, Wei has been a faculty member of Biostatistics in the Columbia University, and also an affiliated member of the Data Science Institute.

In 2011, Wei received the Noether Young Scholar Award of the American Statistical Association, "for outstanding early contributions to nonparametric statistics." In 2015, Wei was elected as a Fellow of the American Statistical Association. Wei is also an elected member of the International Statistical Institute. In 2020 she was named as a Fellow of the Institute of Mathematical Statistics "for contributions to the development, dissemination, and application of mathematical statistics".
