= F. DuBois Bowman =

American biostatistician

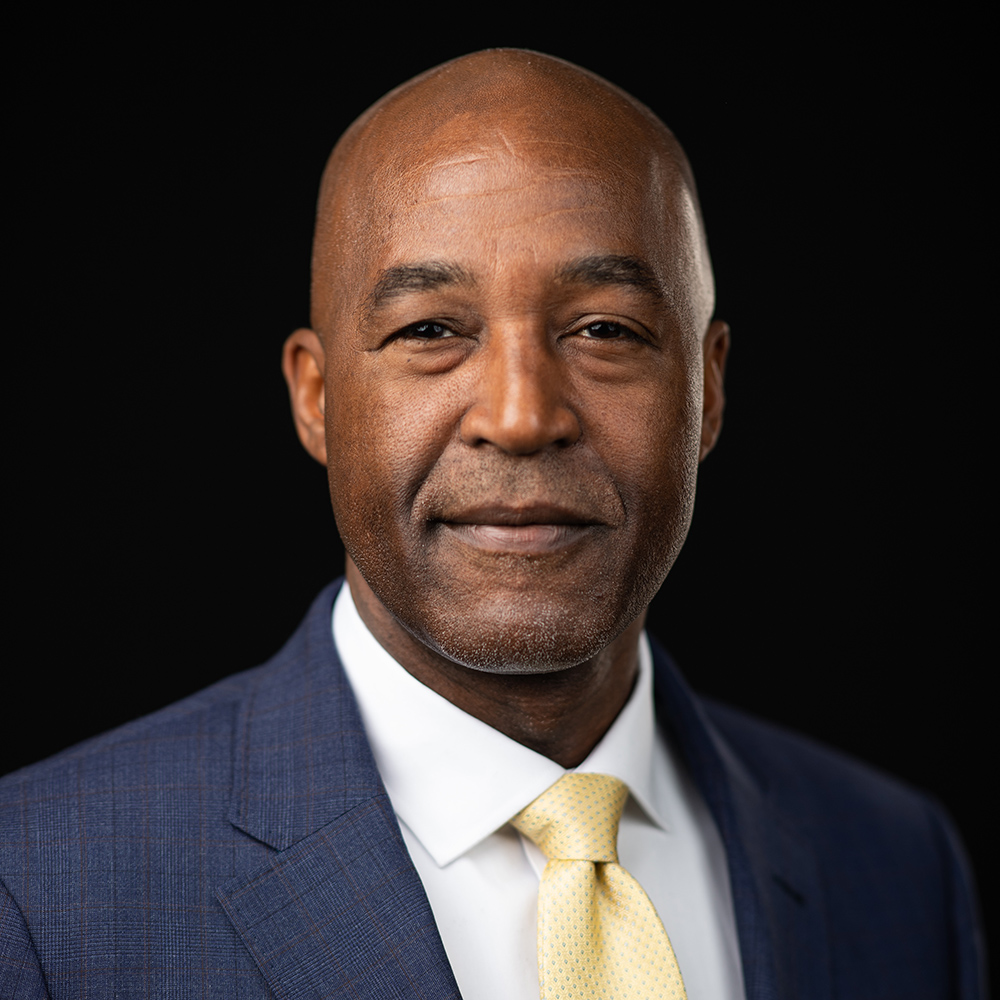
- Born: Ann Arbor, Michigan, U.S.
- Education: Morehouse College (BS); University of Michigan (MS); University of North Carolina, Chapel Hill (PhD)
- Scientific career
- Workplaces: University of Michigan; Washtenaw Community College; Johns Hopkins University; Emory University; Columbia University
- Thesis: A Strategy for Obtaining Inferences about Projected Completors in Longitudinal Studies with Nonignorable Dropout (2000)
- Doctoral advisor: Pranab K. Sen; Paul Stewart

Signature
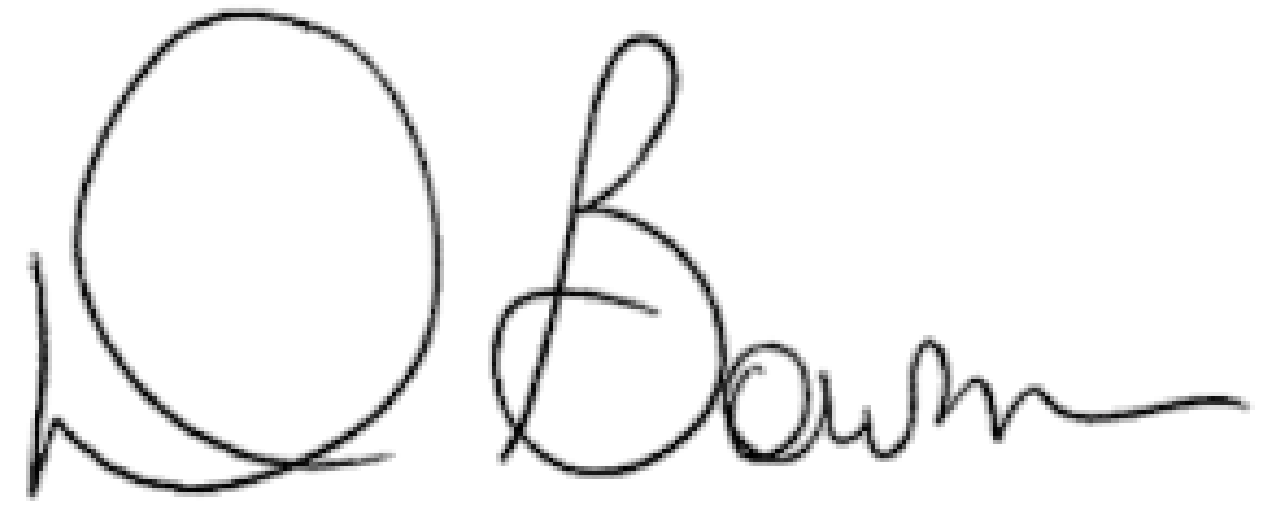

Fredrick DuBois Bowman is an American biostatistician who has been the 13th president of Morehouse College since July 15, 2025. He served as the 12th dean of the School of Public Health at the University of Michigan from October 2018 to July 2025.

Bowman's research applies statistical analysis to brain imaging to better understand Alzheimer's disease, schizophrenia and Parkinson's disease. He is a member of the National Academy of Medicine, fellow of the American Association for the Advancement of Science, and fellow of the American Statistical Association.

== Early life and education ==
Bowman grew up in Ann Arbor, Michigan. He received a Bachelor of Science degree with high honors in mathematics from Morehouse College in 1992, where he also completed the pre-med requirements and joined the Omega Psi Phi fraternity in 1991. He was appointed to the Phi Beta Kappa honour society. He briefly joined the mathematical statistics program at Duke University before electing to focus on biostatistics.

Bowman received a Master of Science degree in biostatistics from University of Michigan in 1995. Whilst a graduate student, Bowman taught trigonometry at the Washtenaw Community College. He received a Doctor of Philosophy degree in biostatistics from the University of North Carolina at Chapel Hill in 2000, co-supervised by Pranab K. Sen and Paul Stewart.

== Career ==
In 2000, Bowman joined Emory University as an assistant professor at the university's Rollins School of Public Health. He was promoted to Associate Professor with tenure in 2006 and Professor in 2013. In 2007 Bowman founded the Center for Biomedical Imaging Statistics. The field of neuroimaging was only just emerging whilst he was on the faculty at Emory, and psychiatrists realised that they would need a good grasp of statistics to make best of use of it. His work looks to understand the environmental origins of neurological conditions, with a particular focus on early diagnosis of Parkinson's disease.

In 2014, Bowman moved to the Columbia University Mailman School of Public Health where he was made Cynthia and Robert Citrone–Roslyn and Leslie Goldstein Professor. Here his work considered biostatistical approaches to better understand brain imaging data. Cynthia and Robert Citrone decided to fund the chair position after meeting Bowman and hearing about the impact of his research. In his time at Columbia University he considerably expanded the department education programmes in biostatistics as well as increasing the neuroimaging grant revenue. Here he served as a member of the Columbia University Data Science Institute.

On July 19, 2018, Bowman was appointed the 12th dean of the University of Michigan School of Public Health, effective October 15, 2018. As Bowman decided to begin his tenure as the 13th president of Morehouse College in Georgia on July 15, 2025, Bowman's last day at the University of Michigan was set July 11, 2025.

== Awards and honors ==
- 2007 Emory University Woodruff Leadership Academy Fellow
- 2008 University of North Carolina at Chapel Hill James Grizzle Distinguished Alumni Award
- 2012 Elected Fellow of the American Statistical Association
- 2013 President of the Eastern North American Region International Biometric Society
- 2019 Morehouse College Bennie Trailblazer Award
- 2019 Elected Fellow of the American Association for the Advancement of Science
- 2020 American Statistical Association Black History Month Trailblazer
- 2020 Elected as a member of the National Academy of Medicine

== Selected publications ==
- Page, Stephanie T.; Amory, John K.; Bowman, F. DuBois; Anawalt, Bradley D.; Matsumoto, Alvin M.; Bremner, William J.; Tenover, J. Lisa (2005-03-01). "Exogenous Testosterone (T) Alone or with Finasteride Increases Physical Performance, Grip Strength, and Lean Body Mass in Older Men with Low Serum T". The Journal of Clinical Endocrinology & Metabolism. 90 (3): 1502–1510. doi:10.1210/jc.2004-1933. hdl:1773/4294. ISSN 0021-972X. PMID 15572415. S2CID 16268965.
- Schuster, David M.; Votaw, John R.; Nieh, Peter T.; Yu, Weiping; Nye, Jonathon A.; Master, Viraj; Bowman, F. DuBois; Issa, Muta M.; Goodman, Mark M. (2007-01-01). "Initial Experience with the Radiotracer Anti-1-Amino-3-18F-Fluorocyclobutane-1-Carboxylic Acid with PET/CT in Prostate Carcinoma". Journal of Nuclear Medicine. 48 (1): 56–63. ISSN 0161-5505. PMID 17204699.
- Robertson, Diana; Snarey, John; Ousley, Opal; Harenski, Keith; Bowman, F. DuBois; Gilkey, Rick; Kilts, Clinton (2007-01-01). "The neural processing of moral sensitivity to issues of justice and care". Neuropsychologia. 45 (4): 755–766. doi:10.1016/j.neuropsychologia.2006.08.014. ISSN 0028-3932. PMID 17174987. S2CID 17055624. Archived from the original on December 19, 2025.
