= Charmaine Yoest =

American writer and activist (born 1964)

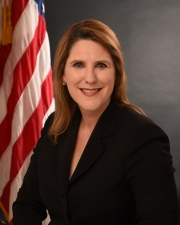

Assistant Secretary of Health and Human Services for Public Affairs
- In office May 14, 2017 – February 28, 2018
- President: Donald Trump
- Succeeded by: Judy Stecker

Personal details
- Born: Charmaine Crouse; 1964 (age 61–62)
- Spouse: Jack Yoest
- Children: 5
- Education: University of Virginia

Charmaine Yoest (née Crouse, born 1964) is an American writer and political commentator. Since 2023, she has been executive director of the House Values Action Team. She served as Assistant Secretary of Health and Human Services for Public Affairs at the United States Department of Health and Human Services from 2017 to 2018. From 2008 to 2016 she was president and CEO of the Americans United for Life, an anti-abortion group.

== Early life ==
Yoest was born to Gilbert L. Crouse, Sr., a government economist, and Janice Shaw Crouse, a speechwriter for President George H. W. Bush and policy analyst at the conservative Christian activist group Concerned Women for America. Yoest attended Taylor University in 1982 and 1983, during which time her mother was Taylor's associate vice president for academic affairs. She then transferred to, and graduated from, Wheaton College, earning a bachelor's degree in politics in 1986.

== Career and activism ==
After graduating college, Yoest went to work in Washington, D. C., as a confidential assistant in the Office of Presidential Personnel in the White House during the administration of President Ronald Reagan. Since 1990, she has been married to John Wesley "Jack" Yoest, Jr., an associate professor at The Catholic University of America. In 1996, Deborah Shaw Lewis and Yoest co-authored Mother in the Middle, an examination of United States child-care policy.

Yoest earned a Ph.D. in politics at University of Virginia in 2004, writing a dissertation on the politics of parental leave. She has received fellowships from several foundations, including Mellon, Olin, Bradley, and Kohler. She also worked as a policy analyst at the Family Research Council from 2005 to 2008, serving as a Senior Fellow and Vice President of Communications.

In 2008, she was a senior adviser to Mike Huckabee's 2008 presidential campaign. Yoest was called to testify before the Senate Judiciary Committee during the July 2009 confirmation hearings for Supreme Court nominee Judge Sonia Sotomayor, whom Yoest unsuccessfully opposed. In 2009, Yoest was treated for breast cancer. On July 1, 2010, Yoest testified before the Senate Judiciary Committee at the confirmation hearings for Supreme Court nominee (and Solicitor General) Elena Kagan. Yoest also opposed Kagan's nomination, and called for a Senate investigation into alleged discrepancies in Kagan's testimony related to partial-birth abortion. In 2012, Yoest was appointed to the Congressional Award Board by Senate Republican Leader Mitch McConnell.

Yoest was president and CEO of Americans United for Life from 2008 to 2016. In 2016, she joined Gary Bauer's group American Values as a senior fellow. After leaving HHS in 2018, she became an associate director of the White House Office of National Drug Control Policy.

In January 2023 Yoest was named executive director of the House Values Action Team, a congressional member organization chaired by Robert Aderholt.

== Position on abortion and birth control ==
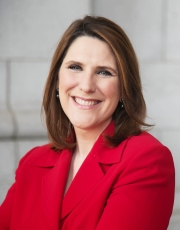
Portrait in March 2016

A 2011 profile in The Christian Science Monitor said Yoest "is not shrill, rigid, or somehow provincial in values or experience. She is not a fire-and-brimstone finger wagger, though faith is a centerpiece of her life." A 2012 profile in The Washington Post discussed Yoest's role in the initial decision by Susan G. Komen for the Cure to stop giving funds to Planned Parenthood.

A 2012 profile in The New York Times said that Yoest's opposition to legal abortion "leaves no room for exceptions in the case of rape or incest, or to preserve the health of the mother. She believes that embryos have legal rights, and opposes birth control, like the IUD, that she thinks 'has life-ending properties'." Yoest has vigorously affirmed the unproven abortion–breast cancer hypothesis, which claims that having an abortion increases the risk of breast cancer. Yoest, former head of the anti-abortion advocacy group Americans United for Life, helped to develop the strategy for a Texas statute filled with obstacles to abortion services, in the guise of protections for women's health. The U.S. Supreme Court abandoned its deference to state law and struck down the law because its underlying factual claims were patently false. Donald Trump appointed Yoest as assistant secretary for public affairs at HHS. She asserts that condoms do not protect against HIV or other sexually transmitted infections. Yoest has claimed that contraception does not reduce the number of abortions, and says that to accept this argument "would be, frankly, carrying water for the other side to allow them to re-define the issue in that way".
