= Baby Gender Mentor =

Blood test designed for prenatal sex discernment

The Baby Gender Mentor packaging advertises a controversial 99.9% accuracy rate and a 48-hour turn-around time.

Baby Gender Mentor is the trade name of a controversial blood test designed for prenatal sex discernment. The test was manufactured by Acu-Gen Biolab, Inc., a biotech company in Lowell, Massachusetts, United States. The test made a media debut on 17 June 2005 on The Today Show and it was featured in Newsweek in October 2005. About 4,500 people had purchased the test by March 2006.

The test claimed that it offered an alternative to amniocentesis and ultrasound. Gender Mentor claimed that women had many motivations for using the test to learn the sex of their fetuses early in pregnancy, including mental preparation and planning gender-specific purchases, or more controversially, sex-selective abortion.

Customers and scientists have questioned the accuracy of the test. Legal actions were taken against Acu-Gen and their supplier. The lawsuits claimed that Acu-Gen's products do not accurately predict the sex of the baby. In their defense, Acu-Gen stated that ultrasound prediction of the sex of a fetus is not always accurate, and told one family their baby had gender abnormalities.

Women were instructed to prick their finger to draw a small amount of blood, which was placed on a card to be sent to Acu-Gen to be analyzed for US$250. The kit did not require regulation since it did not diagnose, prevent or treat a disease. The company was not obliged to disclose results of tests.

Acu-Gen listed studies related to detecting fetal blood cells present in maternal circulation, but studies did not refer specifically to the Baby Gender Mentor test. The company claimed that their kit could detect twins.

== Initial media attention ==
The test was featured on an episode of The Today Show in June 2005. In that show, Katie Couric interviewed a woman named Holly Osburn who was mother to two daughters and expecting. Osborn said that she wanted to know the gender because she wanted to paint the nursery blue. Sherry Bonelli, the CEO of PregnancyStore.com was also interviewed and said that the test had only been available for two weeks and that numerous people had inquired about it in a short time. She also said that Acu-Gen had followed 2,000 pregnancies through to birth and that the lab results given by the Baby Gender Mentor had never been wrong. The Gender Mentor Test used qPCR technology to determine the gender of the baby. It was the first product of its kind to enter the market, despite the fact that many companies had been attempting to develop similar technologies for years. This caused frustration among competitors who had invested significant time and resources into the development of their own gender-determining products. Gender Mentor claimed to have been used in 20,000 pregnancies. On the show, the results of Osborn's test revealed that was going to have another girl. During the same segment of The Today Show, Couric interviewed Dr. Ronald Wapner, head of maternal fetal medicine at NewYork–Presbyterian Hospital, he discussed possible pros and cons of the test. His first concern was whether the stated accuracy rate achieved in the 2,000 test cases would be realized in real world usage. His second concern was whether couples who purchase the test might use the results for family balancing, which means the decision to utilize selective abortion to achieve a baby of the desired sex. Wapner said that one positive aspect of the Baby Gender Mentor test is the non-invasive nature of the test, which means there should be no risk of harm to the fetus.

The test was listed as one of the top 10 innovations of 2005 by research company Datamonitor. In their report, titled Build A Better Mousetrap, Datamonitor identifies their picks for "the best new food, drink, health, household and pet products of 2005". They listed the test as the number 8 innovation of the year.

== Accuracy of the test disputed ==
At least 40 women came forward to say their Baby Gender Mentor tests predicted the wrong sex. Compared to the 20,000 women the Baby Gender Mentor test was used on successfully, these 40+ “inaccurate” tests only account for 0.2% of the tests performed. According to a National Public Radio (NPR) report, the company has explained certain inaccurate results as being the result of a vanishing twin, a fetus that stopped growing soon after fertilization. Acu-Gen claimed that their kit could predict a mixed sex set of fraternal twins, so the test should have predicted twins instead of predicting a single baby whose sex turned out to be incorrect.

With Acu-Gen choosing not to publish proof of its claims and evidence of several women receiving inaccurate predictions, doctors are concerned about the test. Among the scientific evidence cited by Acu-Gen's website is a paper co-authored by Diana Bianchi, an expert on fetal DNA at Tufts University. The NPR story quoted Bianchi as saying, "I think at the present time we need to be concerned whether the test is accurate or not", and "I think it's caveat emptor. Let the buyer beware." Another criticism has come from Sandra Carson, professor of obstetrics and gynecology and involved in research in sex selection. Carson says, "Until Acu-Gen releases its data, there's no way to know the test's reliability. Until that's out, I think it shouldn't be on the market." Carson at that time was at the Baylor College of Medicine. Dr. Charles Lockwood, chairman of obstetrics and gynecology at Yale School of Medicine, said that it is possible for fetal DNA to be found in maternal blood as soon as the placenta has developed, and that detection after five weeks "is not impossible" and the president of Acu-Gen said the suit was "totally bogus".

There are multiple legal challenges and investigations underway. Gail O'Conner, a spokesperson for the Illinois State Attorney General, says that they are investigating PregnancyStore.com for possible fraud. No fraud charges were ever made against PregnancyStore.com.Florida Congressman Jim Davis has urged the FDA to investigate Acu-Gen, and the Florida Attorney General has opened an investigation against Acu-Gen. A law firm named Gainey & McKenna has filed a class action lawsuit and at least one other firm is inviting people to contact them about their legal rights if they are unhappy with the results of their test. Gainey & McKenna's lawsuit seeks to bar the company from false advertising in marketing its test and to compel the firm to honor its money-back guarantee. The law firm cites seven areas of contention, including the veracity of the accuracy claims and the violation of HIPAA and other laws.

== Possible uses for test ==
Parents have cited an interest in preparing themselves or the baby's siblings for gender-specific issues. Some women might prefer this test to an ultrasound exam, which might reveal fetal abnormalities that the parents might prefer not to know about until after delivery.

=== Concerns about sex selection ===
The National Public Radio investigative report on Acu-Gen predicted that parents may use the Baby Gender Mentor test as a basis for determining whether to get a sex-selective abortion. KMSP-TV interviewed genetic counselor Dr. Analia Bortz who made the same prediction. The concern is that learning the sex at such an early point may lead parents to terminate the pregnancy if they were hoping for a baby of the opposite sex to that indicated by the test. Americans United for Life argues that women disappointed by the result of their test would find it easier to have an abortion if they get the results early. They say that women who want to have a specific sex will be learning the results at a time when it is safer for them to have an abortion, without the complications associated with aborting later in pregnancy.

Some bioethicists believe that sex selection is an ethical problem and could be disruptive to society. Charles Lockwood of Yale says, "a disproportionate number of female fetuses have been terminated worldwide, and a 2-to-1 male-to-female ratio could lead to social unrest and wars." According to Arthur Caplan, director of the Center for Bioethics at the University of Pennsylvania, sex selection is not a frequent occurrence in the United States but it is a concern in countries such as India and China, where having boys is preferred over having girls. In China, sex selection has led to men outnumbering women by about 105-to-100. In India, the ratio of girls to boys is also on the decline. The 2004 census shows that there were 818 girls born per 1,000 boys; the ratio varies in different parts of India, with the greatest imbalance occurring in the most affluent areas. In a certain portion of New Delhi, only 762 girls were born per 1,000 boys. Punjab's Health Minister Ramesh Chander Dogra has said he will take action to ban the test in India.

The website for the PregnancyStore.com says that they will ship the tests only within the United States, Sheila McLean, professor of medical ethics at Glasgow University, is critical of the kits.

=== Alleged use for medical diagnoses ===
Acu-Gen's website states the test was not a medical test:

Acu-Gen Biolab, Inc. ("Acu-Gen") and the www.babygendermentor.com website ("Web Site") do not offer medical advice or professional services. The products and information provided with the Baby Gender Mentor Test cannot and should not be used for diagnosing or treating a known or suspected health condition or illness. The Baby Gender Mentor Test is not a substitute for medical or professional care. If you have, or you suspect that you or your baby may have, a health condition or illness, you should consult with your doctor. Never disregard medical or professional care or advice or delay seeking it because of something you have learned from Acu-Gen, the Baby Gender Mentor Test or our Web Site. Except for the specific information contained on our Web Site, you cannot and should not rely on any information provided by Acu-Gen, Acu-Gen employees or other visitors to our Web Site. The content of our Web Site is provided on an "as is" basis.

Tests similar to the Baby Gender Mentor test can be used for medical diagnoses. For instance, scientists have shown that it is possible to use fetal DNA from a woman's blood to screen the fetus for genetic defects such as Down syndrome. In a validation study sponsored by the National Institute for Child Health and Development, 5 different labs used fetal cells from maternal blood to search for evidence of Down syndrome in 2,744 pregnancies. On average, the labs correctly spotted Down syndrome babies 74% of the time.

In at least one case, Chang Wang, the president of Acu-Gen, has phoned a pregnant woman one month after giving her the sex prediction to inform her that her test indicated an "excess of genetic material in her blood" and advised her to see her doctor in order "to rule out problems like Down's syndrome or Trisomy 18". Wang explains this means "with a certain possibility, that her fetus has a kind of genetic problem. Of course later on, we had used our technology to prove that she has a chromosome problem: Trisomy 18. That means that this baby [is] going to have a developmental problem and is going to probably cease to exist right after the birth." Dr. Diana Bianchi of Tufts disputes the possibility of the test being used for such a diagnosis. She says, "The test involves looking at genetic sequences on the X chromosome and the Y chromosome. If he gave a diagnosis of Trisomy 18, that involves a different chromosome, Chromosome 18. That is certainly something that is not advertised in the packaging associated with the test. "It is possible that, upon being told of a problem by Acu-Gen, a woman may seek to have an amniocentesis or other invasive procedure which may be an unnecessary risk if the Acu-Gen diagnosis was in error. In this case, the woman delivered a healthy baby free from both Trisomy 18 and Down syndrome.

The class action lawsuit filed by Gainey & McKenna alleges that Acu-Gen is improperly dispensing medical advice. The law firm claims Wang has contacted "many women" and advised them that their fetuses have chromosomal abnormalities. They claim that Dr. Wang, who is listed as a Ph.D., is providing women "with all sorts of medical advice and diagnoses". They say their clients have suffered great emotional distress and have undergone unnecessary medical testing based upon Dr. Wang's "advice".

== Warranty and availability ==
Acu-Gen has allegedly created new requirements for people who want to take advantage of the money-back guarantee. The attorney Barry Gainey, of Gainey & McKenna, says that Chang Wang, Acu-Gen's President, is "making people send in the original birth certificate. He's making them get blood tests from the newborn baby. And there's other requirements that he's now adding to the refund in order to avoid paying back these people and giving them the 200-percent refund." None of those requirements were on the boxes shipped to early customers, but the requirements have since appeared on Acu-Gen's website. Gainey has filed a class action lawsuit on behalf of 40 people who claim they received inaccurate results but were unable to obtain refunds from Acu-Gen.

There have been conflicting reports about how often the company has refunded money to consumers who received an erroneous result with the test. In February 2006, Wang said, "We don't mistakes [sic]. Period." Yet in October 2005 he had stated his company had issued four refund checks, including one for a case involving a vanishing twin. The PregnancyStore.com states that none of the refund checks were issued as a result of the test being proven wrong by a live birth. Their website states:

To date, Acu-Gen has issued 200% refund checks to a few customers—NOT for incorrectly identifying the baby's gender at birth, though. Two are for cases involving vanishing twins, one case due to insufficient blood sample, two cases caused by incomplete reactions and three reversal cases of no obvious reasons. All of these eight cases are currently in their second trimester of pregnancy.

In March 2006, Wang wrote in an e-mail to NPR, he has "decided to defer all his energies regarding the BGM product and service for one more year, when results of actual births compared to the results provided by Baby Gender Mentor should answer any concern about the accuracy of the test."

Initial news reports and the Acu-Gen website touted a 200% money-back guarantee. In May 2006, the Baby Gender Mentor website was modified to show a different warranty than the one that had originally promised to refund 200% of the purchase price of the test. The new warranty states:

We guarantee that all test results are 99.9% accurate. If your test results are legitimately incorrect, Baby Gender Mentor will refund you all costs that include laboratory and purchasing expenses.* A valid registration code and a birth certificate are required for the refund. You MUST read and follow all kit instructions. Baby Gender Mentor is not responsible for any consequences resulting from failure to follow kit instructions. To claim the refund, the birth certificate should include BOTH the address and name of the purchaser. In some instances, Baby Gender Mentor may request the finger press of the baby to conclude the refund process...

PregnancyStore.com also updated their website to state that the warranty was only 100% of the purchase price. In July 2006, the PregnancyStore.com reported that the test was "currently out of stock", and In-Gender.com, a commercial sales blog, reported that the test has been completely pulled from the market in India. As of January 2007, PregnancyStore.com no longer contains any mention of the kit on their website, although the BabyGenderMentor.com website does contain a form for on-line purchasing of the kit.

== About Acu-Gen ==
Acu-Gen is a biotech company in Lowell, Massachusetts and is led by Chang-ning Wang, the company's President. A National Public Radio reporter visited the address given as the headquarters of Acu-Gen in September 2005. They found that the building at that address contains a Hindu temple and a company called BioTronics, but no sign for Acu-Gen. According to NPR, their inquiries at BioTronics revealed the two companies have common ownership, but no one was available to comment for the NPR story. Acu-Gen does not mention a direct link to BioTronics in their marketing materials. However, they do state on their website that they utilize BioTronics' AmpliSensor technology, according to the Baby Gender Mentor website. AmpliSensor is a quantitative PCR assay invented by Wang and marketed by BioTronics, according to the Baby Gender Mentor website.

A news crew from television station WFTS, an American Broadcasting Company (ABC) affiliate, visited the Acu-Gen offices in February 2006. They found "about six employees inside Wang's lab, some putting together sex test kits, others doing some type of lab work. There was a room full of machines Chang said he created, and shelves stacked with blood samples supposedly sent in by women from across the United States." BioTronics does make a laboratory instrument known as an AG-9600 AmpliSensor Analyzer, which is used for quantitative DNA analysis.

It is not known whether the two journalists visited the same address, nor is it known whether Acu-Gen and BioTronics currently share office or laboratory space. As of January 2007, Acu-Gen lists their address as "50 Stedman Street, Lowell, MA". On December 2, 2006 BioTronics' trademark on "AmpliSensor" (U.S. trademark registration number 1958576) was declared dead and cancelled. At that time, BioTronics' address was listed as "44 Stedman Street, Unit 5, Lowell, MA".

== Bibliography ==
- Wang, CNJ; Wu KY; Wang H (1995). Quantitative PCR Using the AmpliSensor Assay. In: PCR Primer: A Laboratory Manual (Dieffenbach CW, Dveksler GS (eds) ). Cold Spring Harbor Laboratory Press. pp. 193–202. ISBN 978-0-87969-447-0.
