= Katherine Monti =

American biostatistician

Katherine Lane Monti (née Nuckolls) is an American biostatistician known for her works on graphical techniques in statistics and on the statistics of pet health.

== Education and career ==
Monti is the daughter of Katherine (Kit) Buckley Nuckolls, the former chair of pediatric nursing at Yale University. She graduated from Oberlin College, Ohio, in 1971, and married sociologist Daniel J. Monti Jr., and completed a Ph.D. in biostatistics in 1975 at the University of North Carolina at Chapel Hill. Her dissertation, The Locally Optimal Combination of Certain Multivariate Test Statistics, was supervised by Pranab K. Sen.

She became a faculty member at the University of Missouri–St. Louis but moved to industry, working for pet food company Ralston Purina, medical testing company Ciba-Corning Diagnostics, drug design company Astra Pharmaceuticals, and statistical contracting firm Rho. She retired in 2017.

== Service and recognition ==
Through her career, Monti was active in the American Statistical Association, including stints as chair of the Biopharmaceutical Section and president of the Boston Chapter. She was named a Fellow of the American Statistical Association in 2007, and in 2014 the Boston Chapter gave her their Mosteller Statistician of the Year Award. She was one of three 2021 recipients of the American Statistical Association Founders Award for distinguished service to the association.
