= Madan Lal Puri =

Indian-American Statistician

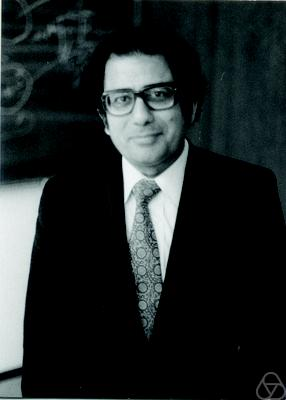
- Madan Puri in 1974
- Born: February 20, 1929 (age 97); Sialkot, India (now Pakistan)
- Education: Punjab University, University of Colorado, University of California
- Known for: Work in statistics
- Scientific career
- Workplaces: Indiana University

Madan Lal Puri (born February 20, 1929) is a statistician from India who built his career in the United States. He was born on February 20, 1929 in Sialkot, and is known for his work in mathematics which has had profound effects on the way statistics is understood and applied. He has won many honours and awards, including the Bicentennial Medal from Indiana University, Bloomington.

== Biography ==
Puri was born in Sialkot in the Punjab, which was a part of India but now is a part of Pakistan after the British Parliament passed the Indian Independence Act in 1947. Due to this his family, including his parents Ganesh Das and S W Puri, fled as refugees to Delhi.

Before the act, Puri was studying in Punjab University which got split into two separate universities; Puri continued his studies in one of the new universities: the Panjab University in Chandigarh. He was awarded a B.A degree in 1948 and got his master's degree from the same university in 1950. In January 1951, he was appointed as lecturer of mathematics at the university and taught at several different colleges until August 1957.

In September 1957, Puri moved the United States as he got appointed as an instructor and graduate student at the University of Colorado, Boulder. In 1958 he moved to the University of California, Berkeley, where he became a research assistant in statistics. His studies were supervised by Erich Lehmann and he was awarded his doctorate in 1962 after submitting a thesis titled Asymptotic Efficiency of a Class of c-Sample Tests. After this, he was appointed as an assistant professor and later associate professor at the Courant Institute of Mathematical Sciences in New York. He gained full professorship at Indiana University, Bloomington.

== Accomplishments ==
On February 20, 2003, Puri was honoured with the title of College of Arts and Sciences Distinguished Research Scholar. Kumble Subbaswamy, dean of the College of Arts and Sciences at Indiana University, Bloomington, said "...it was my great pleasure to honour Madan Lal Puri as College of Arts and Sciences Distinguished Research Scholar. This rare designation is reserved for those who have become world leaders in a field while on the College faculty, and whose collected works are published because of their archival value."

Puri was elected as a member of the International Statistical Institute, a fellow of the Institute of Mathematical Statistics, a fellow of the American Statistical Association, and a fellow of the Royal Statistical Society. Additionally, he was an elected member of the New York Academy of Sciences, and an honorary fellow of the International Indian Statistical Society.

In 1975, the Punjab University in India awarded him a D.Sc. In 1974 and 1983, he received the Senior U.S. Scientist Award from the Alexander von Humboldt Foundation, and in 1974 he was honoured by the German government. He also has been honoured by universities in Australia, New Zealand, Europe, and the Middle East. In 1991, he was a Distinguished Visitor at the London School of Economics and Political Science.

He has many books published in his honour, including Research Developments in Probability and Statistics: Festschrift in Honor of Madan L. Puri on the Occasion of His 65th Birthday, which has articles written by fifty-two different authors.

He was ranked as the fourth most prolific statistician in the world in a report by the Natural Sciences and Engineering Research Council of Canada. Among statisticians in universities which do not have a separate department of statistics, he was ranked number one in the world in the same report.

== Honors and awards ==
- 2019 Bicentennial Medal, Indiana University
- 2014 Wilks Memorial Award
- 2008 Gottfried E. Noether Senior Scholar Award

== Books authored ==
- Puri, Madan L.; Sen, Pranab K. (1985). Nonparametric Methods in General Linear Models. New York: Wiley. ISBN 978-0471702276.
- Puri, Madan L.; Sen, Pranab K. (1971). Nonparametric Methods in Multivariate Analysis. New York: Wiley. ISBN 978-0471702405.
- Puri, Madan L. (2024). Asymptotic Efficiency of a Class of C-Sample Tests (reprint of the 1962 original). London: Forgotten Books. ISBN 9781333542085.
