= Eugene Lukacs =

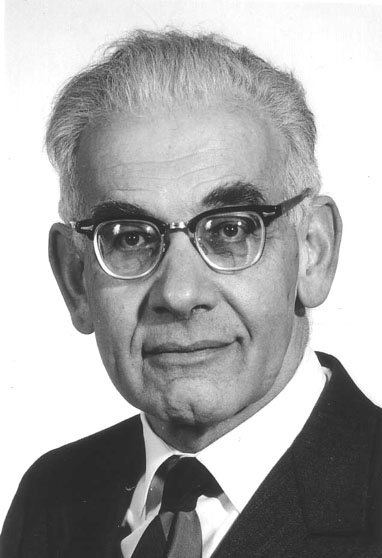
- Eugene Lukacs (1906–1987)
- Born: 14 August 1906; Szombathely, Austria-Hungary
- Died: 21 December 1987 (aged 81); Washington, D.C.
- Education: University of Vienna
- Known for: Characteristic functions (probability theory), Characterization of Distributions
- Scientific career
- Fields: Mathematician, Probabilist, Statistician
- Workplaces: Catholic University of America; Bowling Green State University
- Doctoral advisor: Walther Mayer

Eugene Lukacs (Hungarian: Lukács Jenő, 14 August 1906 – 21 December 1987) was a Hungarian-American statistician notable for his work in characterization of distributions, stability theory, and being the author of Characteristic Functions, a classic textbook in the field.

Born to a Jewish family in Szombathely, from six weeks after birth Lukacs lived in Vienna, Austria. There he received primary and secondary education and studied mathematics at University of Vienna. His professors included Hans Hahn, Eduard Helly, Walther Mayer, Leopold Vietoris and Wilhelm Wirtinger. In 1930 he earned his doctorate in geometry under the supervision of Walther Mayer, and a degree in actuarial science in 1931. Eugene met his future wife Elizabeth Weisz (Lisl) in 1927 at the University of Vienna, and they married in 1935. He taught secondary mathematics for two years and later accepted a position with an insurance company, where Eduard Helly and Z. W. Birnbaum were colleagues. After Germany annexed Austria in 1938, he decided to emigrate to the United States, arriving in 1939.

In 1953 Eugene joined the Office of Naval Research (ONR) USA, and became the director of Statistics. While at ONR he also taught at American University in Washington, D.C.

Lukacs joined the Catholic University of America, Washington, D.C. in 1955. There he organized the Statistical Laboratory in 1959 and became its first and only director. Researchers at the Statistical Laboratory included Edward Batschlet, Tatsuo Kawata, Radha Laha, M. Masuyama and Vijay Rohatgi, and many distinguished visitors.

On his retirement from Catholic University in 1972, he moved with his colleagues Laha and Rohatgi to Bowling Green State University in Bowling Green, Ohio, where he remained until 1976.

His primary interest was in the theory of characteristic functions. Prior to publication of his 1960 monograph, Characteristic Functions, the English language textbooks on the subject were translations of works by Cramer, Gnedenko and Kolmogorov, and Loève. Lukacs' monograph was the first to present a unified and detailed treatment of the subject, and has remained a classical reference on the subject. The revised and expanded second edition of Characteristic Functions appeared in 1970, followed by Developments in Characteristics Function Theory in 1983. Characteristic Functions has been translated into several languages and continues to be an essential resource on the subject.

Lukacs was an elected Fellow of the Institute of Mathematical Statistics since 1957, a Fellow of the American Academy of Arts and Sciences since 1958, and a Fellow of the American Statistical Association since 1969. In 1973 he was elected to the Austrian Academy of Sciences.

== Books ==
- E. Lukacs; R. G. Laha (1964). Applications of Characteristic Functions (Griffin's Statistical Monographs & Courses, No. 14). New York: T. Hafner Pub. Co. p. 202.
- E. Lukacs (1970). Characteristic Functions) (second ed.). New York: Hafner Pub. Co.
- E. Lukacs (1972). Probability and Mathematical Statistics; An Introduction. New York: Academic Press.
- E. Lukacs (1975). Stochastic Convergence. New York: Academic Press.
- E. Lukacs (1983). Developments in Characteristic Function Theory. New York: Macmillan.

== Journal articles ==
- Laha, R. G.; Lukacs, E. (1977). "On a functional equation which occurs in a characterization problem". Aequationes Mathematicae. 16 (3): 259–274. doi:10.1007/BF01836038. S2CID 122866588.
- Beer, S.; Lukacs, E. (1973). "Characterizations of the normal distribution by suitable transformations". Journal of Applied Probability. 10 (1): 100–108. doi:10.2307/3212498. JSTOR 3212498. S2CID 125053197.
- Cuppens, R.; Lukacs, E. (1970). "On the domains of definition of analytic characteristic functions". Annals of Mathematical Statistics. 41 (3): 1096–1101. doi:10.1214/aoms/1177696990.
- Laha, R. G.; Lukacs, E.; Rényi, A. (1964). "A generalization of a theorem of E. Vincze". Magyar Tud. Akad. Mat. Kutató Int. Közl. 9: 237–239.
- Laha, R. G.; Lukacs, E.; Newman, M. (1960). "On the independence of a sample central moment and the sample mean". Annals of Mathematical Statistics. 31 (4): 1028–1033. doi:10.1214/aoms/1177705675.
- Laha, R. G.; Lukacs, E. (1960). "On the independence of a sample central moment and the sample mean". Annals of Mathematical Statistics. 31 (4): 1028–1033. doi:10.1214/aoms/1177705675.
- Laha, R. G.; Lukacs, E. (1960). "On certain functions of normal variates which are uncorrelated of a higher order". Biometrika. 47 (1/2): 175–176. doi:10.2307/2332969. JSTOR 2332969.
- Laha, R. G.; Lukacs, E. (1960). "On a problem connected with quadratic regression". Biometrika. 47 (3–4): 335–343. doi:10.1093/biomet/47.3-4.335.
- Lukacs, Eugene (1955). "A characterization of the gamma distribution". Annals of Mathematical Statistics. 26 (2): 319–324. doi:10.1214/aoms/1177728549.
- Lukacs, Eugene; King, Edgar P. (1954). "A property of the normal distribution". Annals of Mathematical Statistics. 25 (2): 389–394. doi:10.1214/aoms/1177728796.
- Lukacs, Eugene; Szász, Otto (1954). "Nonnegative trigonometric polynomials and certain rational characteristic functions". Journal of Research of the National Bureau of Standards. 52 (3): 153–160. doi:10.6028/jres.052.021.
- Lukacs, Eugene; Szász, Otto (1954). "Certain Fourier transforms of distributions. II". Canadian Journal of Mathematics. 6: 186–189. doi:10.4153/CJM-1954-020-5. S2CID 247197222.
- Lukacs, Eugene (1952). "The stochastic independence of symmetric and homogeneous linear and quadratic statistics". Annals of Mathematical Statistics. 23 (3): 442–449. doi:10.1214/aoms/1177729389.
- Lukacs, Eugene (1942). "A characterization of the normal distribution". Annals of Mathematical Statistics. 13: 91–93. doi:10.1214/aoms/1177731647.

== See also ==
- Lukacs's proportion-sum independence theorem
- Eugene Lukacs Distinguished Visiting Professor
