= Sheila McLean =

- Born: 20 June 1951 (age 75)
- Education: University of Glasgow
- Scientific career
- Fields: Legal scholar
- Workplaces: University of Glasgow; School of Law

Sheila Ann Manson McLean OBE FRSE FRCPE FRCGP FRSA (born 20 June 1951) is International Bar Association Professor of Law and Ethics in Medicine and director of the Institute of Law and Ethics in Medicine at the School of Law of the University of Glasgow. McLean was the Book Reviewers' Editor for Medical Law International.

== Career ==
In 1990, McLean was appointed the first International Bar Association Professor of Law and Ethics in Medicine, and has since pursued a distinguished research career. She has published widely, in particular on consent, reproductive and end of life issues. She authored a controversial book concerning the ethical future of applied genetic engineering, entitled Modern Dilemma : Choosing Children, and has spoken out with criticism of the Baby Gender Mentor test.

McLean has also held a number of appointments, both nationally and internationally. Currently, she is UK Adviser to the European branch of the World Health Organization on the revision of its Health for All policy, a member of the UNESCO Biomedical Ethics Committee, and Specialist Adviser to the House of Commons Science and Technology Select Committee. Between 1997 and 1998, she chaired the Department of Health review of consent provisions in the Human Fertilisation and Embryology Act 1990 and between 2000 and 2003, chaired the Independent Review Group on Organ Retention at Post Mortem. From 1999 to 2002, she was the first Chairman of the Scottish Criminal Cases Review Commission.

She has been awarded honorary degrees by the Universities of Abertay Dundee and Edinburgh, and Fellowships of the Academy of Medical Sciences, Royal Society of Edinburgh, Royal College of Physicians of Edinburgh, Royal College of General Practitioners and the Royal Society of Arts. She is also a distinguished supporter of Humanists UK.

McLean was appointed Officer of the Order of the British Empire (OBE) in the 2020 New Year Honours for services to health and education.
