= Yingying Fan =

American statistician and professor

Yingying Fan is a Chinese-American statistician and Centennial Chair in Business Administration and Professor in Data Sciences and Operations Department of the Marshall School of Business at the University of Southern California. She is currently the Associate Dean for the PhD Program at USC Marshall. She also holds joint appointments at the USC Dana and David Dornsife College of Letters, Arts and Sciences, and Keck Medicine of USC. Her contributions to statistics and data science were recognized by the Royal Statistical Society Guy Medal in Bronze in 2017 and the Institute of Mathematical Statistics Medallion Lecture in 2023. She was elected Fellow of American Statistical Association in 2019 and Fellow of Institute of Mathematical Statistics for seminal contributions to high-dimensional inference, variable selection, classification, networks, and nonparametric methodology, particularly in the field of financial econometrics, and for conscientious professional service in 2020. She was also elected Fellow of Asia-Pacific Artificial Intelligence Association in 2024.

Fan, along with her collaborators, has developed some popular statistical and data science tools including the generalized information criterion (GIC), the model-X knockoffs (MXK), the deep learning inference using knockoffs (DeepLINK), and the statistical inference on membership profiles in large networks (SIMPLE), as well as some fundamental asymptotic theory for high-dimensional random forests and the eigenvectors of large random matrices.

Some of her representative publications include:

- Fan, Y., Gao, L. and Lv, J. (2025). ARK: robust knockoffs inference with coupling. The Annals of Statistics 53, 749-773.
- Chi, C.-M., Vossler, P., Fan, Y. and Lv, J. (2022). Asymptotic properties of high-dimensional random forests. The Annals of Statistics 50, 3415-3438.
- Fan, J., Fan, Y., Han, X. and Lv, J. (2022). SIMPLE: statistical inference on membership profiles in large networks. Journal of the Royal Statistical Society Series B 84, 630-653.
- Zhu, Z., Fan, Y., Kong, Y., Lv, J. and Sun, F. (2021). DeepLINK: deep learning inference using knockoffs with applications to genomics. Proceedings of the National Academy of Sciences of the United States of America 118, e2104683118.
- Candès, E. J., Fan, Y., Janson, L. and Lv, J. (2018). Panning for gold: 'model-X' knockoffs for high dimensional controlled variable selection. Journal of the Royal Statistical Society Series B 80, 551-577.
- Fan, Y. and Tang, C. (2013). Tuning parameter selection in high dimensional penalized likelihood. Journal of the Royal Statistical Society Series B 75, 531-552.

She currently co-edits the Journal of Business & Economic Statistics. In addition, she serves as the IMS editor of Statistics Surveys as well as the IMS-CUP coordinating editor for the IMS-Cambridge University Press Textbooks/Monographs Series.
