= Myles Hollander =

American academic statistician (1941–2025)

Myles Hollander (March 21, 1941 – January 27, 2025) was an American academic statistician who made research contributions to nonparametric methods, biostatistics, and reliability. He was born in Brooklyn, New York. After earning a Bachelor of Science degree in mathematics from Carnegie Mellon University (1961), he pursued a Master of Science (1962) and Ph.D (1965) in statistics at Stanford University. He began teaching at Florida State University in 1965, and held the Robert O. Lawton Distinguished Professorship of Statistics at from 1998 to 2007. He was a Fellow of the American Statistical Association (1972), the Institute of Mathematical Statistics, and the International Statistical Institute.

Hollander was married to Glee Ross from 1963 until her death in 2015. He died on January 27, 2025, at the age of 83.
