= Pranab K. Sen =

American statistician (1937–2023)

Pranab Kumar Sen
- Born: 7 November 1937; Calcutta, Bengal Presidency, India
- Died: 31 December 2023 (aged 86); Chapel Hill, North Carolina, U.S.
- Citizenship: American
- Education: University of Calcutta (BS, MS, PhD)
- Known for: Nonparametric statistics; Theil–Sen estimator; Hodges–Lehmann–Sen estimator
- Scientific career
- Fields: Statistics
- Workplaces: University of North Carolina at Chapel Hill
- Doctoral advisor: Hari Kinkar Nandi
- Doctoral students: Vernon Chinchilli; Malay Ghosh; Katherine Monti; Susan Murphy; F. DuBois Bowman; Yosef Hochberg

Pranab Kumar Sen (7 November 1937 – 31 December 2023) was an Indian-American statistician who was a professor of statistics and the Cary C. Boshamer Professor of Biostatistics at the University of North Carolina at Chapel Hill.

== Biography ==
Pranab Kumar Sen was born in Calcutta, Bengal Presidency, India on 7 November 1937, as the second of seven siblings. His father, a railway officer, died of leukemia when Sen was ten, and he was raised by his mother, the daughter of a physician. He began his undergraduate studies at Presidency College, Kolkata, initially intending to study medicine but shifting to statistics when it was discovered that he was too young for medical college. He received a B.S. from the University of Calcutta in 1955, an M.Sc. in 1957, and a Ph.D. in 1962; his doctoral advisor was Hari Kinkar Nandi. He taught for three years at the University of Calcutta and one more year at the University of California, Berkeley before joining the UNC faculty in 1965; although he has held visiting positions at other universities, he remained at Chapel Hill for the rest of his career. He was the founding co-editor of two journals, Sequential Analysis and Statistics and Decisions, and was joint editor-in-chief of the Journal of Statistical Planning and Inference from 1980 to 1983.

Sen died in Chapel Hill, North Carolina on 31 December 2023, at the age of 86.

== Research and graduate advising ==
Sen was the author or co-author of multiple books on non-parametric statistics, the advisor of over 80 Ph.D. students, and the author of over 600 research publications. He is known for inventing the Hodges–Lehmann estimator independently of and contemporaneously with Hodges and Lehmann and for the Theil–Sen estimator, a form of robust regression that fits a line to two-dimensional sample points by choosing the slope of the fit line to be the median of the slopes of the lines through pairs of samples.

== Awards and honors ==
Sen was a fellow of the Institute of Mathematical Statistics and of the American Statistical Association (ASA). He became the Cary C. Boshamer Professor in 1982. He was the Lukacs Distinguished Visiting Professor at Bowling Green State University in 1996–1997. In 2002, he won the Gottfried E. Noether Senior Scholar Award of the ASA, and he was the 2010 winner of its Wilks Memorial Award "for outstanding contributions to statistical research, especially in nonparametric statistics and biostatistics; and for exceptional service in mentoring doctoral students." In 2012, the University of Calcutta awarded him an honorary Doctor of Science degree.

In 2007, a festschrift was dedicated to him on the occasion of his 70th birthday.

== Books authored ==
- Sen, Pranab K.; Singer, Julio M.; Pedroso de Lima, Antonio (2010). From Finite Sample to Asymptotic Methods in Statistics. Cambridge University Press. ISBN 978-0-521-87722-0.
- Hájek, Jaroslav; Šidák, Zbyněk; Sen, Pranab K. (1999). Theory of Rank Tests (2nd ed.). San Diego: Academic Press. ISBN 0-12-642350-4.
- Puri, Madan L.; Sen, Pranab K. (1985). Nonparametric Methods in General Linear Models. New York: Wiley. ISBN 978-0471702276.
- Puri, Madan L.; Sen, Pranab K. (1971). Nonparametric Methods in Multivariate Analysis. New York: Wiley. ISBN 978-0471702405.
