= Abortion–breast cancer hypothesis =

Posit that induced abortion can increase the risk of breast cancer

The abortion–breast cancer hypothesis posits that having an induced abortion can increase the risk of getting breast cancer. This hypothesis is at odds with mainstream scientific opinion and is rejected by major medical professional organizations; despite this, it continues to be widely propagated as pseudoscience, typically in service of an anti-abortion agenda.

In early pregnancy, hormone levels increase, leading to breast growth. The hypothesis proposes that if this process is altered by an abortion, then more immature cells could be left behind, and that these immature cells could increase the risk of breast cancer over time.

The abortion–breast cancer hypothesis has been the subject of extensive scientific inquiry, and the scientific community has concluded that abortion does not cause breast cancer; and that breast cancer should not be a concern for women who are having a miscarriage or considering having an abortion. This consensus is supported by major medical bodies, including the World Health Organization, the U.S. National Cancer Institute, the American Cancer Society, the American Congress of Obstetricians and Gynecologists, the Royal College of Obstetricians and Gynaecologists, the German Cancer Research Center, and the Canadian Cancer Society.

Some anti-abortion activists have continued to advance a discredited causal link between abortion and breast cancer. In the United States, they have advanced state legislation that in several states requires health care providers to present abortion as a cause of breast cancer when counseling women who are seeking abortion. This political intervention culminated when the George W. Bush administration altered the National Cancer Institute website to suggest that abortion might cause breast cancer. In response to public concern over this intervention, the NCI convened a 2003 workshop bringing together over 100 experts on the issue. This workshop concluded that while some studies reported a statistical correlation between breast cancer and abortion, the strongest scientific evidence from large prospective cohort studies demonstrates that abortion is not associated with an increase in breast cancer risk, and that the positive findings were likely due to response bias.

The ongoing promotion of a link between abortion and breast cancer is seen by others as part of the anti-abortion "woman-centered" strategy against abortion. Anti-abortion groups maintain they are providing information necessary for legally required informed consent, a concern shared by some politically conservative politicians. The abortion–breast cancer issue remains the subject of political controversy.

== Views of medical organizations ==
Major medical organizations which have analyzed data on abortion and breast cancer have uniformly concluded that abortion does not cause breast cancer. These organizations include the World Health Organization, the U.S. National Cancer Institute, the American Cancer Society, the American Congress of Obstetricians and Gynecologists, the Royal College of Obstetricians and Gynaecologists, the German Cancer Research Center, and the Canadian Cancer Society.

- The World Health Organization concluded in 2012 that "sound epidemiological data show no increased risk of breast cancer for women following spontaneous or induced abortion", updating their earlier finding that "induced abortion does not increase breast cancer risk".
- The American Cancer Society concluded: "At this time, the scientific evidence does not support the notion that abortion of any kind raises the risk of breast cancer or any other type of cancer."
- The U.S. National Cancer Institute, which is part of the National Institutes of Health, found that "induced abortion is not associated with an increase in breast cancer risk", assigning this conclusion the strongest possible evidence rating.
- The American Congress of Obstetricians and Gynecologists found that "early studies of the relationship between prior induced abortion and breast cancer risk were methodologically flawed. More rigorous recent studies demonstrate no causal relationship between induced abortion and a subsequent increase in breast cancer risk."
- The Royal College of Obstetricians and Gynaecologists reviewed the medical literature and concluded that "there is no established link between induced abortion or miscarriage and development of breast cancer." The college recommended in its official clinical practice guidelines that "Women should be informed that induced abortion is not associated with an increase in breast cancer risk."
- The German Cancer Research Center concluded in 2013 that abortion and miscarriage pose no risk of breast cancer.
- The Canadian Cancer Society stated in 2013: "The body of scientific evidence does not support an association between abortion and increased breast cancer risk."

== Proponents ==
Joel Brind, a faculty member at Baruch College in the Department of Natural Sciences, is the primary advocate of an abortion–breast cancer ("ABC") link. Brind is strongly anti-abortion and began lobbying politicians with the claim that abortion caused breast cancer in the early 1990s. Brind found that his lobbying efforts were not taken seriously because he had not published his findings in the peer-reviewed medical literature. He therefore collaborated with two anti-abortion physicians and a statistician to publish a 1996 article in the Journal of Epidemiology and Community Health, arguing that induced abortion was a risk factor for breast cancer. The statistician who collaborated with Brind later stated of their findings: "I have some doubts. I don't think the issue has been resolved. When we were talking about the conclusions, he [Brind] wanted to make the strongest statements. I tried to temper them a little bit, but Dr. Brind is very adamant about his opinion."

Brind's paper was criticized in the Journal of the National Cancer Institute for ignoring the role of response bias and for a "blurring of association with causation." The amount of attention the study received prompted a cautionary editorial by a JECH editor. With the appearance of larger studies contradicting Brind's finding, Brind failed to convince the scientific community that abortion caused breast cancer. In 2003, Brind was invited to the NCI workshop on abortion and breast cancer, where he was the only one to formally dissent from the workshop's finding that there is no link between the two. Brind blames the lack of support for his findings on a conspiracy, arguing that the NCI and other major medical organizations are engaged in a "cover-up" for the purpose of "protecting the abortion industry".

== Proposed mechanism ==
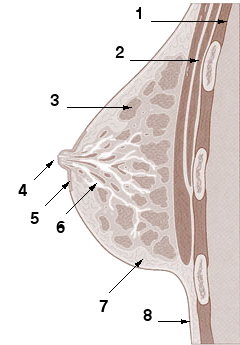
Lobules are 3, ducts are 6.

In early pregnancy, levels of estrogen, progesterone, and estradiol increase, leading to breast growth in preparation for lactation. Proponents speculate that if this process is interrupted by an abortion or miscarriage—before full maturity (differentiation) in the third trimester—then more immature cells could be left than there were prior to the pregnancy. These immature cells could then be exposed to carcinogens and hormones over time, resulting in a greater potential risk of breast cancer. This mechanism was first proposed and explored in rat studies conducted in the 1980s.

Breast tissue contains many lobes (segments) and these contain lobules which are groups of breast cells. There are four types of lobules:

- Type 1 has 11 ductules (immature)
- Type 2 has 47 ductules (immature)
- Type 3 has 80 ductules (mature, fewer hormone receptors)
- Type 4 are fully matured (cancer resistant) and contain breast milk

During early pregnancy, type 1 lobules quickly become type 2 lobules because of changes in estrogen and progesterone levels. Maturing into type 3 and then reaching full differentiation as type 4 lobules requires an increase of human placental lactogen (hPL) which occurs in the last few months of pregnancy. According to the abortion–breast cancer hypothesis, if an abortion were to interrupt this sequence then it could leave a higher ratio of type 2 lobules than existed prior to the pregnancy. Russo and Russo have shown that mature breast cells have more time for DNA repair with longer cell cycles, accounting for the slightly reduced risk of breast cancer for parous women against the baseline risk for women who have never conceived and those who have conceived and terminated their pregnancies.

Later on, Russo et al. found that placental human chorionic gonadotropin (hCG) induces the synthesis of inhibin by the mammary epithelium. Bernstein et al. independently observed a reduced breast cancer risk when women were injected with hCG for weight loss or infertility treatment. Contrary to the ABC hypothesis, Michaels et al. hypothesize since hCG plays a role in cellular differentiation and may activate apoptosis, as levels of hCG increase early on in human pregnancy, "an incomplete pregnancy of short duration might impart the benefits of a full-term pregnancy and thus reduce the risk of breast cancer."

== History ==
The first study involving statistics on abortion and breast cancer was a broad study in 1957 examining common cancers in Japan. The researchers were cautious about drawing any conclusions from their unreliable methodologies. During the 1960s several studies by Brian MacMahon et al. in Europe and Asia touched on a correlation between abortion and breast cancer. Their 1973 paper published in the Journal of the National Cancer Institute inaccurately concluded that "where a relationship was observed, abortion was associated with increased, not decreased, risk." Research relevant to the current ABC discussion focuses on more recent large cohort studies, a few meta-analyses, many case-control studies, and several early experiments with rats.

=== Rat models ===
Russo & Russo from the Fox Chase Cancer Center in Philadelphia conducted a study in 1980 examining the proposed correlation between abortion and breast cancer. While analysing the effects of the carcinogen 7,12-Dimethylbenz(a)anthracene (DMBA) on the DNA labeling index (DNA-LI) in terminal end buds (TEBs), terminal ducts (TDs) and alveolar buds (ABs) of Sprague-Dawley rats in various stages of reproductive development, they found that rats who had interrupted pregnancies had no noticeable increase in risk for cancer. However, they did find that pregnancy and lactation provided a protective measure against various forms of benign lesions, such as hyperplastic alveolar nodules and cysts. While results did suggest that rats who had interrupted pregnancies might be subject to "similar or even higher incidence of benign lesions" than virgin rats, there was no evidence to suggest that abortion would result in a higher incidence of carcinogenesis. A more thorough examination of the phenomenon was conducted in 1982, confirming the results. A later study in 1987 further explained their previous findings. After differentiation of the mammary gland resulting from a full-term pregnancy of the rat, the rate of cell division decreases and the cell cycle length increases, allowing more time for DNA repair.

Despite the fact that the Russos' studies found similar risk rates between virgin and pregnancy interrupted rats, their research would be used to support the contention that abortion created a greater risk of breast cancer for the next twenty years. However, because rats do not exhibit naturally occurring breast cancer, the extrapolation of these results to human abortion and breast cancer is viewed as dubious.

== Epidemiological evidence ==
The results of prospective cohort studies on the relationship between abortion and breast cancer have been consistently negative. Such studies are considered more reliable than retrospective studies and case-control studies. The positive association between abortion and breast cancer risk observed in case-control studies may be accounted for by recall bias.

In 1996, Brind et al. published a meta-analysis of 23 studies which reported a positive association existed between induced abortion and breast cancer risk. The authors estimated the relative risk of breast cancer among women who had had an induced abortion to be 1.3, compared to women who had not had an abortion. It was criticized by other researchers for multiple reasons, including allegations that it failed to account for publication bias (positive studies tend to be more likely to be published). The meta-analysis was also criticized because the studies it included were almost all case-control studies, which are susceptible to recall bias, and for which it is difficult to select an appropriate control group.

In 1997, Wingo et al. reviewed 32 studies on the abortion-breast cancer relationship and concluded that the results of studies on this subject were too inconsistent to allow for definitive conclusions, for either induced or spontaneous abortions.

A 2004 analysis of data from 53 studies involving 83,000 women with breast cancer reported no increased risk among women who had had either an induced or spontaneous abortion. The relative risk of breast cancer for women who had a spontaneous abortion in this analysis was 0.98, and that for induced abortion was 0.93.

A 2015 systematic review and meta-analysis of prospective studies found insufficient evidence to support an association between induced or spontaneous abortion and an increased risk of breast cancer.

== Politicization ==
By the late 1980s, national politicians recognized that a focus on reducing access to abortion was not a winning political strategy. Some anti-abortion activists grew more aggressive and violent in the face of political abandonment, culminating with the murder of Dr. David Gunn in 1993 and the passage of the Freedom of Access to Clinic Entrances Act in 1994. With direct action discredited, anti-abortion organizations, including the National Right to Life Committee, came to the forefront of the movement. These focused on legal tactics, including lobbying against late-term abortions and access to mifepristone and demanding legislation based on the purported ABC link. More recently, anti-abortion organizations have turned to lobbying to increase obstacles to abortion, such as mandated counseling, waiting periods, and parental notification, and some feel that anti-abortion advocates treat ABC as simply another tactic in their campaign against abortion. There have been ongoing and incremental legal challenges to abortion in the United States by anti-abortion groups. In 2005, a Canadian anti-abortion organization put up billboards in Alberta with large pink ribbons and the statement: "Stop the Cover-Up", in reference to the ABC hypothesis. The Canadian Breast Cancer Foundation was concerned by the misrepresentation of the state of scientific knowledge on the subject.

The continued focus on the ABC hypothesis by anti-abortion groups has fostered a confrontational political environment. Anti-abortion advocates and scientists alike have responded with criticisms. The claims by anti-abortion advocates are sometimes referred to as pseudoscience.

During the late 1990s, several members of the United States Congress became involved in the ABC issue. In a 1998 hearing on cancer research, U.S. Representative Tom Coburn accused the National Cancer Institute of misleading the public by selectively releasing data. In 1999, shortly after the House debated FDA approval of the abortion drug mifepristone, U.S. Representative Dave Weldon wrote a "Dear Colleague" letter, enclosing an article from John Kindley. In it, Weldon expressed concern that the majority of studies indicated a possible ABC link and that politicization was "preventing vital information from being given to women."

As of 2019, abortion counseling materials in Alaska, Kansas, Mississippi, Oklahoma, and Texas incorrectly assert a possible link between abortion and breast cancer, while Minnesota materials correctly report no link. Similar legislation requiring notification has also been introduced in 14 other states. An editor for the American Journal of Public Health expressed concern that these bills propose warnings that do not agree with established scientific findings.

Bioethicist Jacob M. Appel argues that the mandatory disclosure statutes might be unconstitutional on "rational basis" grounds. Childbirth is significantly more dangerous than abortion, data that is not required in any disclosure law but which is necessary for a meaningful understanding of risks. According to Appel, "[i]f the roughly fifty million abortions that have occurred in the United States since Roe v. Wade had all ended in full-term deliveries, approximately five hundred additional women would have died during childbirth."

In May 2017, President Donald Trump appointed Charmaine Yoest, an anti-abortion activist and proponent of the abortion-breast cancer link, to the post of assistant secretary for public affairs in the Department of Health And Human Services.

=== National Cancer Institute ===
The National Cancer Institute (NCI) has been a target of the anti-abortion movement for the conclusions presented on its website. A report from the Committee on Oversight and Government Reform found that in November 2002 the Bush administration had altered the NCI website. The previous NCI analysis had concluded that, while some question regarding an association between abortion and breast cancer existed prior to the mid-1990s, a number of large and well-regarded studies had resolved the issue in the negative. The Bush administration removed this analysis and replaced it with the following:

[T]he possible relationship between abortion and breast cancer has been examined in over thirty published studies since 1957. Some studies have reported statistically significant evidence of an increased risk of breast cancer in women who have had abortions, while others have merely suggested an increased risk. Other studies have found no increase in risk among women who have had an interrupted pregnancy.

This alteration, which suggested that there was scientific uncertainty on the ABC issue, prompted an editorial in The New York Times describing it as an "egregious distortion" and a letter to the Secretary of Health and Human Services from members of Congress. In response to the alteration the NCI convened a three-day consensus workshop entitled Early Reproductive Events and Breast Cancer on 24–26 February 2003. The workshop concluded that induced abortion does not increase a woman's risk of breast cancer, and that the evidence for this had been well established. Afterwards, the director of epidemiology research for the American Cancer Society stated, "[t]his issue has been resolved scientifically ... This is essentially a political debate."

Brind was the only attendee at the workshop to file a dissenting opinion as a minority report criticizing the conclusions. He contends the workshop evidence and findings were overly controlled by its organizers and that the time allotted was too short for a thorough review of the literature.

=== North Dakota lawsuit ===
In January 2000, Amy Jo Kjolsrud (née Mattson), an anti-abortion counselor, sued the Red River Women's Clinic in Fargo, North Dakota, alleging false advertising. The suit, Kjolsrud v. MKB Management Corporation, alleged that the clinic was misleading women by distributing a brochure quoting a National Cancer Institute fact sheet on the ABC hypothesis. The brochure stated:

Anti-abortion activists claim that having an abortion increases the risk of developing breast cancer and endangers future childbearing. None of these claims are supported by medical research or established medical organizations. (emphasis in original)

The case was originally scheduled for 11 September 2001, but was delayed as a result of the terrorist attacks. On 25 March 2002, the trial began. After four days of testimony, Judge Michael McGuire ruled in favor of the clinic.

Linda Rosenthal, an attorney from the Center for Reproductive Rights characterized the decision as a rejection of "scare tactics". John Kindley, one of the lawyers representing Kjolsrud, highlighted the "individual's right to self-determination". Kindley also wrote a 1998 Wisconsin Law Review article outlining the viability of medical malpractice lawsuits based upon not informing patients considering abortion about the ABC hypothesis.

The decision was appealed and on 23 September 2003 the North Dakota Supreme Court ruled that Kjolsrud did not have standing and affirmed the lower court ruling dismissing the action. The appeal said that Kjolsrud had not read the materials, and that after the lawsuit was filed, the brochures were updated to refute the breast cancer link, citing the National Cancer Institute.
