= Joel Brind =

American biologist

Joel L. Brind
- Education: Yale University (B.S.); New York University (Ph.D.)
- Known for: Abortion-breast cancer hypothesis
- Scientific career
- Fields: Endocrinology
- Workplaces: Baruch College
- Thesis: Studies on the androgen-dependent differentiation of cells of the mouse preputial gland : metabolism of testosterone and effects of selected drugs and hormones (1981)
- Website: Brind's faculty page

Joel Lewis Brind is a professor of human biology and endocrinology at Baruch College, City University of New York and a leading advocate of the abortion-breast cancer hypothesis, which posits that abortion increases the risk of breast cancer. This idea is rejected by mainstream medical professional organizations and there is overwhelming evidence in the peer-reviewed medical literature debunking it. Brind is openly contemptuous of mainstream medical professional organizations and journals, accusing them of conducting a deliberate cover-up with the goal of "protecting the abortion industry."

== Early life, education, and religious conversion ==
Brind grew up in Laurelton, Queens, where he decided he wanted to become a biochemist at the age of 10 after reading an issue of Life magazine where the cover story described the discoveries scientists had recently made about the inner workings of the cell, using electron microscopy. He has a bachelor's degree from Yale (1971) and a Ph.D. from New York University in biochemistry, immunology and physiology. Four years after receiving his PhD in 1981, Brind converted to Christianity, and decided to try to use science to pursue what he saw as a "noble task" of discouraging women from having abortions.

== Advocacy of Non-Mainstream Medical Hypotheses ==
=== Abortion-Breast-Cancer Hypothesis ===
Following his conversion to Christianity, Brind began working as a consultant and expert witness for the anti-abortion cause. Discover magazine reported in 2003 that since 1997, "Brind has spent about 90 percent of his time outside the classroom investigating and publicizing" his claimed abortion-breast cancer link, testifying "in courthouses and statehouses in Arizona, Florida, Massachusetts, Ohio, North Dakota, New Hampshire, and Alaska."

He fought against the legalization of mifepristone for non-surgical abortions in the USA, testifying at a federal hearing that "thousands upon thousands" of women would develop breast cancer as a result of using the drug. Brind was an invitee to the National Cancer Institute's conference on the abortion-breast-cancer issue where he was the only member to file a dissenting opinion. In a meeting between Colorado Right To Life and the Denver affiliate of Susan G. Komen for the Cure regarding Komen grants to Planned Parenthood, Brind urged the breast cancer group to re-consider the idea that abortion is linked to breast cancer.

In 1999, Brind co-founded the Breast Cancer Prevention Institute, a non-profit group which promotes a link between abortion and breast cancer. The group is identified in the academic literature as an anti-abortion activist group that promotes "the notion that a link to cancer has been both irrefutably proved and deliberately concealed by the medical establishment."

=== Glycine Supplements ===
While he was working on studies concerning amino acid metabolism and aging, Brind began promoting the hypothesis that most diets are deficient in the amino acid glycine, and that this deficiency is responsible for illnesses caused by chronic inflammation, including arthritis, diabetes, cardiovascular disease and cancer. These hypotheses are not supported by mainstream medical or nutritional science. He also claims to have prevented himself from suffering ordinary pain and stiffness after strenuous exercise, and after severe injury, by taking glycine supplements, and, to have accelerated the healing of sunburn, by the same means. In 2010, Brind founded Natural Food Science, LLC, through which glycine supplement products Proglyta and Sweetamine are manufactured and sold.

== Meta-analysis ==
Brind et al. (1996) conducted a meta-analysis of 23 independent epidemiologic studies of abortion and breast cancer. The study was published in the Journal of Epidemiology and Community Health in October 1996. It calculated that there was on average a relative risk of 1.3 (1.2 - 1.4) increased risk of breast cancer. The meta-analysis was criticized in the Journal of the National Cancer Institute for ignoring the role of response bias and for a "blurring of association with causation." It was also criticized for selection bias by using studies with widely varying results, using different types of studies and not working with the raw data from several studies, and including studies that have methodological weaknesses. The statistician who collaborated with Brind later stated of their findings: "I have some doubts. I don't think the issue has been resolved. When we were talking about the conclusions, he [Brind] wanted to make the strongest statements. I tried to temper them a little bit, but Dr. Brind is very adamant about his opinion."

=== Criticism ===
Experts believe Brind overlooks the methodological weaknesses of some studies he uses as evidence for an abortion-breast cancer link. Furthermore, medical researchers note Brind overstates his findings since his own research shows a "barely statistically significant" increase in breast cancer rates. In reaction to the criticism, an editor of the journal that published Brind's study noted, with concern:

However, in the light of recent unease about appropriate but open communication of risks associated with oral contraceptive pills, it will surely be agreed that open discussion of risks is vital and must include the people – in this case the women – concerned. I believe that if you take a view (as I do), which is often called 'pro-choice', you need at the same time to have a view which might be called 'pro-information' without excessive paternalistic censorship (or interpretation) of the data.
