= Joseph Gastwirth =

Joseph Lewis Gastwirth (born August 31, 1938) is an American statistician and Professor Emeritus of Statistics and Economics at George Washington University. He is known for his work on measuring economic inequality, including the Lorenz curve and Gini coefficient.

He is a Fellow of the American Statistical Association, the Institute of Mathematical Statistics, and the American Association for the Advancement of Science, and an elected member of the International Statistical Institute.

== Early life and education ==
Gastwirth was born in New York City. He attended Stuyvesant High School. He graduated summa cum laude from Yale University in 1958 with a B.S. in Mathematics. He earned an M.A. in Pure Mathematics from Princeton University in 1960 and a Ph.D. in Mathematical Statistics from Columbia University in 1963.

== Career ==
In 1964, Gastwirth joined Johns Hopkins University as an assistant professor of Statistics and was promoted to associate professor in 1967.

In 1971, Gastwirth served as Visiting Faculty Advisor to the Office of Statistical Policy within the Office of Management and Budget in the Executive Office of the President. He joined George Washington University as Professor of Statistics and Economics in 1972. He retired in January 2024.

== Research ==
Gastwirth in his 1971 paper in Econometrica provided a rigorous general definition of the Lorenz curve, and his work derived robust estimators and asymptotic theory for the Gini coefficient and related indices from grouped data. He has also introduced median-based and middle-class-focused measures of inequality to supplement the Gini coefficient. In collaboration with researchers at the National Institutes of Health, Gastwirth adapted these measures to the study of health disparities.

Gastwirth's two-volume treatise Statistical Reasoning in Law and Public Policy, published by Academic Press in 1988, addresses the use of statistical reasoning in legal and public-policy contexts. He also edited the volume Statistical Science in the Courtroom, published by Springer in 2000.

His work has been cited in federal court decisions and in government guidance from the Office of Federal Contract Compliance Programs, including guidance on practical significance issued on July 23, 2019, and rules and procedures for investigating and resolving discrimination issues published in the Federal Register in 2020.

Cases citing his work include Vuyanich v. Republic National Bank, Apsley v. Boeing, and Chamberlin v. Fisher, 885 F.3d 832 (5th Cir. 2018).

Gastwirth developed statistical methods for estimating the prevalence of rare diseases using group testing while preserving the anonymity of subjects, with early applications to HIV/AIDS antibody prevalence in blood donors.

== Awards and honors ==
- Washington Statistical Society Award 1969
- Fellow, American Statistical Association elected 1970
- Fellow, American Association for the Advancement of Science 1971
- Fellow, Institute of Mathematical Statistics elected 1972
- Elected Member, International Statistical Institute 1980
- John Simon Guggenheim Foundation Fellowship 1985
- Shiskin Award for Economic Statistics 1998
- Noether Award, American Statistical Association 2012
- Karl E. Peace Award, American Statistical Association 2019

== Selected publications ==
- Gastwirth, J. L. (1966). "On Robust Procedures". Journal of the American Statistical Association. 61: 929–948.
- Chernoff, H.; Gastwirth, J. L.; Johns, M. V. Jr. (1967). "Asymptotic Distribution of Linear Combinations of Functions of Order Statistics with Application to Estimation". Annals of Mathematical Statistics. 38: 52–72.
- Gastwirth, J. L. (1971). "A General Definition of the Lorenz Curve". Econometrica. 39: 1037–1038.
- Gastwirth, J. L. (1972). "Robust Estimation of the Lorenz Curve and Gini Index". Review of Economics and Statistics. 54: 306–316.
- Gastwirth, J. L.; Hammick, P. A. (1989). "Estimation of the Prevalence of a Rare Disease, Preserving the Anonymity of the Subjects by Group Testing: Application to Estimating the Prevalence of AIDS Antibodies in Blood Donors". Journal of Statistical Inference and Planning. 22: 15–27.
