= Radha Laha =

Indian mathematical statistician (1930-1999)

Laha, Radha
- Born: Radha Govind Laha; 1 October 1930; Calcutta, India
- Died: 14 July 1999 (aged 68); Perrysburg, Ohio
- Education: Indian Statistical Institute, Calcutta University
- Known for: Work in Characteristic Functions, Probability Theory
- Scientific career
- Fields: Mathematician, Probabilist, Statistician
- Workplaces: Indian Statistical Institute, Calcutta; Catholic University of America; Bowling Green State University
- Doctoral advisor: C. R. Rao

Radha Govind Laha (1 October 1930 – 14 July 1999) was an Indian-American probabilist, statistician, and mathematician, known for his work in probability theory, characteristic functions, and characterisation of distributions.

== Biography ==
=== Early life ===
He was born in Calcutta, India and he was a student of C. R. Rao at Calcutta University, where in 1957 he earned a doctorate in analytical probability theory from the Indian Statistical Institute. His dissertation was entitled On Characterization of probability distribution and statistics from specified scholastic relations.

Laha's primary and secondary education was completed in Calcutta. In 1949 he graduated first in rank with a bachelor's degree in statistics from Presidency College, Calcutta. He earned his master's degree in statistics in 1951, and doctoral degree in analytical probability theory from Calcutta University in 1957. Prizes and awards during this period include the Saradprasad prize, the Duff scholarship, the S.S. Bose Gold Medal, University of Calcutta Silver Medal, and Fulbright Fellowship in the US.

=== Career ===
In 1952 Laha joined the staff of the Indian Statistical Institute, Theoretical Research and Training School, Calcutta, India, in pure and applied statistics. In 1958 he was a research associate at Catholic University of America in Washington, D.C. He returned to the Indian Statistical Institute for two years, and joined the faculty of Catholic University as a faculty member in 1962. During this period Laha established an international reputation, and he visited statistical institutes at University of Paris, France, ETH Zurich, Switzerland, and in the United States. He moved to Bowling Green State University in 1972, along with his colleagues Eugene Lukacs and Vijay Rohatgi, to start a new PhD program there. Laha retired from Bowling Green State University in 1996 and died in Perrysburg, Ohio on 14 July 1999 after a long illness.

Laha was the author of several classical texts on probability theory and statistics and numerous publications in journals. He was an honoured Fellow of the Institute of Mathematical Statistics and an elected member of the International Statistical Institute.

Laha was particularly interested in characterisations of the normal distribution. One of his well-known results is his disproof of a long-standing conjecture: that the ratio of two independent, identically distributed random variables is Cauchy distributed if and only if the variables have normal distributions. Laha became known for disproving this conjecture. Laha also proved several generalisations of the classical characterisation of normal sample distribution by the independence of sample mean and sample variance.

=== Philanthropist ===
Laha made a generous endowment from his estate to the American Mathematical Society and the Institute of Mathematical Statistics. The AMS established the Radha G. Laha Gardens in 2001. A portion of the Laha Gardens outside the AMS headquarters in Providence, Rhode Island is identified by a plaque inscribed 'to honour his gift and commitment to mathematical research'. In 2001 with Laha's generous bequest, the Institute of Mathematical Statistics established the Laha Awards to provide travel funds to present a paper at the IMS Annual Meeting.

== Books ==
- E. Lukacs and R. G. Laha (1964). Applications of Characteristic Functions (Griffin's Statistical Monographs & Courses, No. 14). New York: T. Hafner Pub. Co. p. 202.
- I. M. Chakrevarti, R. G. Laha and J. Roy (1967). Handbook of Methods of Applied Statistics I: Techniques of computation, descriptive methods, and statistical inference. New York.: Wiley.
- I. M. Chakrevarti, R. G. Laha and J. Roy (1967). Handbook of Methods of Applied Statistics II: Planning of surveys and experiments. New York.: Wiley.
- R. G. Laha and V. K. Rohatgi (1979). Probability Theory. New York.: Wiley. p. 557.

== Journal articles ==
- Kagan, Abram; Laha, R. G. (2001). "A property of linear forms of independent random variables related to uniqueness of linear structure". J. Statist. Plann. Inference. 92 (1–2): 13–20. doi:10.1016/S0378-3758(00)00159-2.
- Laha, R. G. (1998). "An extension of the Darmois–Skitovich theorem". Math. Methods Statist. 7 (4): 479–483.
- Kagan A, Laha RG, Rohatgi V (1997). "Independence of the sum and absolute difference of independent random variables does not imply their normality". Math. Methods Statist. 6 (2): 263–265.
- Laha, R. G. (1991). A characterisation of Gaussian law in Hilbert space, Aequationes Mathematicae 41 (1991), no. 1, 85–93.
- Laha, R. G.; Lukacs, E. (1977). "On a functional equation which occurs in a characterization problem". Aequationes Mathematicae. 16 (3): 259–274. doi:10.1007/BF01836038. S2CID 122866588.
- Laha, R. G. (1964). "On the decomposition of a class of functions of bounded variation". Can. J. Math. 16: 479–484. doi:10.4153/CJM-1964-049-8. S2CID 124766763.
- Laha, R. G.; Lukacs, E. (1962). "On a factorization of characteristic functions which have a finite number of derivatives at the origin". Publ. Inst. Statist. Univ. Paris. 11: 221–224.
- Laha, R. G.; Lukacs, E. (1964). "On a problem connected with quadratic regression". Biometrika. 47 (3–4): 335–343. doi:10.1093/biomet/47.3-4.335.
- Laha, R. G.; Lukacs, E.; Newman, M. (1960). "On the independence of a sample central moment and the sample mean". Annals of Mathematical Statistics. 31 (4): 1028–1033. doi:10.1214/aoms/1177705675.
- Laha, R. G.; Lukacs, E. (1960). "On certain functions of normal variates which are uncorrelated of a higher order". Biometrika. 47 (1–2): 175–176. doi:10.1093/biomet/47.1-2.175.
- Laha, R. G. (1959). "On the laws of Cauchy and Gauss". Annals of Mathematical Statistics. 30 (4): 1165–1174. doi:10.1214/aoms/1177706102.
- Laha, R. G. (1958a). "On a factorization theorem in the theory of analytic characteristic functions". Annals of Mathematical Statistics. 29 (3): 922–926. doi:10.1214/aoms/1177706553.
- Laha, R. G. (1958b). "An example of a nonnormal distribution where the quotient follows the Cauchy law". Proc. Natl. Acad. Sci. USA. 44 (2): 222–223. Bibcode:1958PNAS...44..222L. doi:10.1073/pnas.44.2.222. PMC 335393. PMID 16590171.
- Roy, J.; Laha, R. G. (1957). "On partially balanced linked block designs". Annals of Mathematical Statistics. 28 (2): 488–493. doi:10.1214/aoms/1177706977.
- Laha, R. G. (1957). "On some characterization problems connected with linear structural relations". Annals of Mathematical Statistics. 28 (2): 405–414. doi:10.1214/aoms/1177706968.
- Basu, D.; Laha, R. G. (1954). "On Some Characterizations of the Normal Distribution". Sankhyā. 13 (4): 359–362. JSTOR 25048183.
