= Xuming He =

Statistician

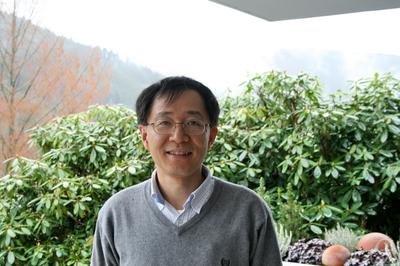
- Awards: Carver Medal from Institute of Mathematical Statistics; Founders Award from American Statistical Association; Gottfried E. Noether Distinguished Scholar Award

Academic background
- Education: Fudan University; University of Illinois Urbana-Champaign

Academic work
- Discipline: Statistics
- Institutions: University of Michigan (2011–2020); Washington University in St. Louis (2023–current)

Xuming He (Chinese: 何旭铭) is the Kotzubei Beckmann Distinguished Professor and Inaugural Chair of Statistics and Data Science at the Washington University in St. Louis. He serves as President (2023–2025) of the International Statistical Institute.

== Biography ==
He earned a bachelor's degree in Applied Mathematics from Fudan University in 1984. He went to graduate school at University of Illinois Urbana-Champaign in 1985 and received a Master's degree in Mathematics and then Ph.D. in Statistics in 1989. He joined the University of Michigan as H. C. Carver Collegiate Professor in 2011, and served as Department Chair from 2015 to 2020. He was appointed as the inaugural chair of the department of Statistics and Data Science at Washington University in St. Louis on July 1, 2023. His prior appointments include faculty positions at National University of Singapore and University of Illinois Urbana-Champaign. His research interests include theory and methodology in robust statistics, semiparametric models, quantile regression, data depth, dimension reduction, and subgroup analysis. His interdisciplinary research aims to promote the better use of statistics in biosciences, climate studies, dysphagia research, and social-economic studies.

== Honors and awards ==
Xuming He is Fellow of the American Association for the Advancement of Science, the American Statistical Association, the Institute of Mathematical Statistics, and an Elected Member of the International Statistical Institute. He held a Visiting Chair Professorship of the Changjiang Scholars program, sponsored by the Chinese Ministry of Education and Li Ka Shing Foundation (2008). He was IMS Medallion Lecturer and Keynote Speaker at the 2007 Joint Statistical Meetings, and Plenary Speaker at the 21st International Conference on Computational Statistics (COMPSTAT 2014). At the 62nd World Statistics Congress (2019) he delivered The International Association for Statistical Computing (IASC)'s President's Lecture.

In 2015, he received the Distinguished Achievement Award from the International Chinese Statistical Association. In 2021, he received the American Statistical Association Founders Award, the Distinguished Faculty Achievement Award from the University of Michigan, as well as a Rackham Distinguished Graduate Mentor Award. He received the Carver Medal (2022) from the Institute of Mathematical Statistics for his decades-long contributions to the statistics profession. In 2025, he received the Gottfried E. Noether Distinguished Scholar Award from the American Statistical Association.

== Professional services ==
- Elected Council member of the Institute of Mathematical Statistics (IMS) 2004–2006;
- President of the International Chinese Statistical Association (ICSA), 2010;
- Elected Council member of the International Statistical Institute (ISI) 2013–2017;
- Program Director of Statistics, National Science Foundation 2003–2005;
- Program Chair, 2010 Joint Statistical Meetings;
- Chair of the Scientific Program Committee, 2013 World Statistics Congress;
- Editor of the IMS Bulletin (2007–2010);
- Co-Editor of Journal of the American Statistical Association (2011–2014)
- Editor of IMS Monographs/Textbooks (2017–2020)
- President-Elect of the International Statistical Institute (2021-2023)
