= List of presidents of the Royal Statistical Society =

The president of the Royal Statistical Society is the head of the Royal Statistical Society (RSS), elected biennially by the Fellows of the Society. The time-period between elections has varied in the past.

The president oversees the running of the Society and chairs its council meetings. The president gives a presidential address at some point in their tenure, which is published in the longest running journal of the society, Series A, setting out personal views on the future of discipline and the role of the society. In recent years, almost all presidents have been nominated following many years' service to the Society, although some have been nominated to mark their eminence in society generally, such as Harold Wilson.

Nominations for president are received by the society's Nominating Committee. The committee recommends at least one fellow to Council who, at a meeting, agree a preferred candidate or candidates. If only one preferred candidate is selected, the Fellowship are given four weeks to offer an alternate candidate.

There has only been one contested election in the Society's history, in 1977. Many fellows objected to the nomination by the Council of Campbell Adamson because he was not a statistician, was said to have made derogatory comments about statisticians, and principally because in the previous year he had been defeated in an election to the Council of the Society, and fellows felt that he was being foisted upon the Society by the current 'establishment' in an essentially undemocratic fashion. Henry Wynn was nominated by several fellows (including Adrian Smith, himself later president, and Philip Dawid) and won the election.

Despite women being elected fellows from 1858, only five have been president of the society. Three of these have been in the 21st century although the proportion remains biased to men with ten male presidents since 2001, with an eleventh man as the current president-elect.

In 2010, Bernard Silverman stepped down very early in his presidential term. This was due to being appointed as chief scientific advisor to the Home Office which presented a conflict of interest as the society sometimes issues expert statements on statistical matters in public life. In 2022 then president-elect David Firth withdrew on health grounds, prompting a further election in which the immediate past-president, Andrew Garrett, was elected. The current president is Prof Sir John Aston.

== Honorary presidents ==
Three Princes of Wales have been an honorary president:

- 1872 - 1901 Albert Edward, Prince of Wales (later Edward VII)
- 1902 - 1910 George, Prince of Wales (later George V)
- 1921 - 1936 Edward, Prince of Wales (later Edward VIII)

== List of presidents ==
=== 19th century ===
- 1834–1836 The Marquess of Lansdowne
- 1836–1838 Sir Charles Lemon, Bt
- 1838–1840 The Earl FitzWilliam
- 1840–1842 Viscount Sandon
- 1842–1843 The Marquess of Lansdowne
- 1843–1845 Lord Ashley
- 1845–1847 The Lord Monteagle of Brandon
- 1847–1849 The Earl FitzWilliam
- 1849–1851 The Earl of Harrowby
- 1851–1853 The Lord Overstone
- 1853–1855 The Earl FitzWilliam
- 1855–1857 The Earl of Harrowby
- 1857–1859 Lord Stanley
- 1859–1861 Lord John Russell
- 1861–1863 Sir John Pakington, Bt
- 1863–1865 William Henry Sykes
- 1865–1867 The Lord Houghton
- 1867–1869 William Ewart Gladstone
- 1869–1871 William Newmarch
- 1871–1873 William Farr
- 1873–1875 William Guy
- 1875–1877 James Heywood
- 1877–1879 George Shaw-Lefevre
- 1879–1880 Thomas Brassey
- 1880–1882 James Caird
- 1882–1884 Robert Giffen
- 1884–1886 Rawson W. Rawson
- 1886–1888 George Goschen
- 1888–1890 Thomas Graham Balfour
- 1890–1892 Frederic J. Mouat
- 1892–1894 Charles Booth
- 1894–1896 The Lord Farrer
- 1896–1897 John Biddulph Martin
- 1897 Alfred Edmund Bateman
- 1897–1899 Leonard Courtney
- 1899–1900 Henry Fowler
- 1900–1902 The Lord Avebury

=== 20th century ===
- 1902–1904 Patrick George Craigie
- 1904–1905 Sir Francis Powell, Bt
- 1905–1906 The Earl of Onslow
- 1906–1907 Richard Martin
- 1907–1909 Sir Charles Dilke, Bt
- 1909–1910 Jervoise Athelstane Baines
- 1910–1912 Lord George Hamilton
- 1912–1914 Francis Ysidro Edgeworth
- 1914–1915 The Lord Welby
- 1915–1916 Lord George Hamilton
- 1916–1918 Bernard Mallet, Registrar General
- 1918–1920 Herbert Samuel
- 1920–1922 R. Henry Rew
- 1922–1924 The Lord Emmott
- 1924–1926 Udny Yule
- 1926–1928 The Viscount D'Abernon
- 1928–1930 A. William Flux
- 1930–1932 Sir Josiah Stamp
- 1932–1934 The Lord Meston
- 1934–1936 Major Greenwood
- 1936–1938 The Lord Kennet
- 1938–1940 Arthur Lyon Bowley
- 1940–1941 Henry William Macrosty
- 1941 Hector Leak
- 1941–1943 William Beveridge
- 1943–1945 Ernest Charles Snow
- 1945–1947 The Lord Woolton
- 1947–1949 David Heron
- 1949–1950 Sir Geoffrey Heyworth
- 1950–1952 Austin Bradford Hill
- 1952–1954 Ronald Fisher
- 1954–1955 The Lord Piercy
- 1955–1957 Egon Pearson
- 1957–1959 Harry Campion
- 1959–1960 Hugh Beaver
- 1960–1962 Maurice Kendall
- 1962–1964 Joseph Oscar Irwin
- 1964–1965 Sir Paul Chambers
- 1965–1966 L. H. C. Tippett
- 1966–1967 M. S. Bartlett
- 1967–1968 Frank Yates
- 1968–1969 Arthur Cockfield
- 1969–1970 R. G. D. Allen
- 1970–1971 Bernard Benjamin
- 1971–1972 George Alfred Barnard
- 1972–1973 Harold Wilson
- 1973–1974 D. J. Finney
- 1974–1975 Henry Daniels
- 1975–1977 Stella Cunliffe
- 1977–1978 Henry Wynn
- 1978–1980 Sir Claus Moser
- 1980–1982 David Cox
- 1982–1984 Peter Armitage
- 1984–1985 Walter Bodmer
- 1985–1986 John Nelder
- 1986–1987 James Durbin
- 1987–1989 John Kingman
- 1989–1991 Peter G. Moore
- 1991–1993 T. M. F. Smith
- 1993–1995 D. J. Bartholomew
- 1995–1997 Adrian Smith
- 1997–1999 Robert Nicholas Curnow
- 1999–2001 Denise Lievesley

=== 21st century ===
- 2001–2003 Peter Green
- 2003–2005 Andrew P. Grieve
- 2005–2007 Tim Holt
- 2008–2009 David Hand
- 2010–2010 Bernard Silverman (resigned Feb 2010; replaced pro tem by David Hand)
- 2011–2012 Valerie Isham
- 2013–2014 John Pullinger
- 2014–2016 Peter Diggle
- 2017–2018 David Spiegelhalter
- 2019–2020 Deborah Ashby
- 2021–2022 Sylvia Richardson
- 2023–2024 Andrew Garrett
- 2025-date John Aston
