= Guy Medal =

Guy Medal in Gold
- Awarded for: Distinction in statistics
- Country: United Kingdom
- Presented by: Royal Statistical Society
- First award: 1892
- Website: rss.org.uk/training-events/events/honours/guy-medal/

The Guy Medals are awarded by the Royal Statistical Society in three categories; Gold, Silver and Bronze. The Silver and Bronze medals are awarded annually. The Gold Medal was awarded every three years between 1987 and 2011, but is awarded biennially as of 2019. They are named after William Guy.

- The Guy Medal in Gold is awarded to fellows or others who are judged to have merited a signal mark of distinction by reason of their innovative contributions to the theory or application of statistics.
- The Guy Medal in Silver is awarded to any fellow or, in exceptional cases, to two or more fellows in respect of a paper/papers of special merit communicated to the Society at its ordinary meetings, or in respect of a paper/papers published in any of the journals of the Society. General contributions to statistics may also be taken into account.
- The Guy Medal in Bronze is awarded to fellows, or to non-fellows who are members of a section or a local group, in respect of a paper or papers read to a section or local group or at any conference run by the Society, its sections or local groups, or published in any of the Society's journals. Preference will be given to people under the age of 35. Exceptionally two or more authors of a paper/papers may be considered for the award provided they are members of sections or local groups.

== Gold Medalists ==
- 1892 Charles Booth
- 1894 Robert Giffen
- 1900 Jervoise Athelstane Baines
- 1907 Francis Ysidro Edgeworth
- 1908 Patrick G. Craigie
- 1911 G. Udny Yule
- 1920 T. H. C. Stevenson
- 1930 A. William Flux
- 1935 Arthur Lyon Bowley
- 1945 Major Greenwood
- 1946 Ronald Fisher
- 1953 A. Bradford Hill
- 1955 Egon Pearson
- 1960 Frank Yates
- 1962 Harold Jeffreys
- 1966 Jerzy Neyman
- 1968 Maurice Kendall
- 1969 M. S. Bartlett
- 1972 Harald Cramér
- 1973 David Cox
- 1975 George Alfred Barnard
- 1978 Roy Allen
- 1981 David George Kendall
- 1984 Henry Daniels
- 1986 Bernard Benjamin
- 1987 Robin L. Plackett
- 1990 Peter Armitage
- 1993 George E. P. Box
- 1996 Peter Whittle
- 1999 Michael Healy
- 2002 Dennis Lindley
- 2005 John Nelder
- 2008 James Durbin
- 2011 C. R. Rao
- 2013 John Kingman
- 2014 Bradley Efron
- 2016 Adrian Smith
- 2019 Stephen Buckland
- 2020 David Spiegelhalter
- 2022 Nancy Reid
- 2024 Peter Diggle
- 2026 Peter McCullagh

== Silver Medalists ==
- 1893 John Glover
- 1894 Augustus Sauerbeck
- 1895 Arthur Lyon Bowley
- 1897 Fred J. Atkinson
- 1899 Charles Stewart Loch
- 1900 Richard Crawford
- 1901 Thomas A. Welton
- 1902 R. H. Hooker
- 1903 Yves Guyot
- 1904 D. A. Thomas
- 1905 R. Henry Rew
- 1906 W. Napier Shaw
- 1907 Noel A. Humphreys
- 1909 Edward Brabrook
- 1910 G. H. Wood
- 1913 Reginald Dudfield
- 1914 Simon Rowson
- 1915 Sydney John Chapman
- 1918 J. Shield Nicholson
- 1919 J. C. Stamp
- 1921 A. William Flux
- 1927 H. W. Macrosty
- 1928 Ethel Newbold
- 1930 Herbert Edward Soper
- 1934 John Harry Jones
- 1935 Ernest Charles Snow
- 1936 Ralph George Hawtrey
- 1938 Edmund Cecil Ramsbottom
- 1939 Leon Isserlis
- 1940 Hector Leak
- 1945 Maurice Kendall
- 1950 Harry Campion
- 1951 F. A. A. Menzler
- 1952 M. S. Bartlett
- 1953 J. Oscar Irwin
- 1954 L. H. C. Tippett
- 1955 David George Kendall
- 1957 Henry Daniels
- 1958 George Barnard
- 1960 Edgar C. Fieller
- 1961 David Cox
- 1962 P. V. Sukhatme
- 1964 George Box
- 1965 C. R. Rao
- 1966 Peter Whittle
- 1968 Dennis Lindley
- 1973 Robin Plackett
- 1976 James Durbin
- 1977 John Nelder
- 1978 Peter Armitage
- 1979 Michael Healy
- 1980 Mervyn Stone
- 1981 John Kingman
- 1982 Henry Wynn
- 1983 Julian E. Besag
- 1984 John C. Gittins
- 1985 Derek Bissell and Wilfrid Pridmore
- 1986 Richard Peto
- 1987 John Copas
- 1988 John Aitchison
- 1989 Frank Kelly
- 1990 David Clayton
- 1991 Richard L. Smith
- 1992 Robert Curnow
- 1993 Adrian Smith
- 1994 David Spiegelhalter
- 1995 Bernard Silverman
- 1996 Steffen Lauritzen
- 1997 Peter Diggle
- 1998 Harvey Goldstein
- 1999 Peter Green
- 2000 Walter Gilks
- 2001 Philip Dawid
- 2002 David Hand
- 2003 Kanti Mardia
- 2004 Peter Donnelly
- 2005 Peter McCullagh
- 2006 Mike Titterington
- 2007 Howell Tong
- 2008 Gareth Roberts
- 2009 Sylvia Richardson
- 2010 Iain M. Johnstone
- 2011 Peter Hall
- 2012 David Firth
- 2013 Brian D. Ripley
- 2014 Jianqing Fan
- 2015 Anthony C. Davison
- 2016 Nancy Reid
- 2017 Neil Shephard
- 2018 Peter Bühlmann
- 2019 Susan Murphy
- 2020 Arnaud Doucet
- 2021 Håvard Rue
- 2022 Paul Fearnhead
- 2023 Mark Girolami
- 2024 Jonathan Tawn
- 2025 Richard Samworth
- 2026 Christl Donnelly

== Bronze Medalists ==
- 1936 William Gemmell Cochran
- 1938 Ronald Frank George
- 1949 W. J. Jennett
- 1962 Peter Armitage
- 1966 James Durbin
- 1967 Frank Downton
- 1968 Robin Plackett
- 1969 Malcolm C. Pike
- 1970 Peter G. Moore
- 1971 D. J. Bartholomew
- 1974 Graham N. Wilkinson
- 1975 Alfred Frederick Bissell
- 1976 P. L. Goldsmith
- 1977 A. F. M. Smith
- 1978 Philip Dawid
- 1979 T. M. F. Smith
- 1980 A. John Fox
- 1982 Stuart Pocock
- 1983 Peter McCullagh
- 1984 Bernard Silverman
- 1985 David Spiegelhalter
- 1986 D. F. Hendry
- 1987 Peter Green
- 1988 Sarah C. Darby
- 1989 Sheila M. Gore
- 1990 Valerie S. Isham
- 1991 Mike G. Kenward
- 1992 Christopher Jennison
- 1993 Jonathan Tawn
- 1994 Rosemary F. A. Poultney
- 1995 Iain Johnstone
- 1996 John N. S. Matthews
- 1997 Gareth Roberts
- 1998 David Firth
- 1999 Peter W. F. Smith and Jon Forster
- 2000 Jon Wakefield
- 2001 Guy Nason
- 2002 Geert Molenberghs
- 2003 Peter Lynn
- 2004 Nicola Best
- 2005 Steve Brooks
- 2006 Matthew Stephens
- 2007 Paul Fearnhead
- 2008 Fiona Steele
- 2009 Chris Holmes
- 2010 Omiros Papaspiliopoulos
- 2011 Nicolai Meinshausen
- 2012 Richard Samworth
- 2013 Piotr Fryzlewicz
- 2014 Ming Yuan
- 2015 Jinchi Lv
- 2017 Yingying Fan
- 2018 Peng Ding
- 2019 Jonas Peters
- 2020 Rachel McCrea
- 2021 Pierre E. Jacob
- 2022 Rajen Shah
- 2023 Tengyao Wang
- 2024 Chris Oates
- 2025 Jenny Wadsworth
- 2026 Maria Skoularidou

== See also ==
- List of mathematics awards
