= Ernest Charles Snow =

English statistician (1886–1959)

Ernest Charles Snow CBE was born in Woodford, Essex on 12 March 1886. He was educated at East London College. In 1902 Snow won an Open Mathematical Scholarship at The Queen’s College, Oxford.

During the First World War, Snow worked as a statistician at the War Office and in 1919 became the manager and later the director of the United Tanners' Association.

During his tenure, he wrote several books and papers such as the 440-page volume "Leather, Hides, Skin and Tanning Material" in 1924.

Snow was appointed a Commander of the Order of the British Empire (CBE) in the New Year Honours of 1938.

There are many articles by Snow published in the Journal of the Royal Statistical Society. One of his last (and the Presidential Address) was in 1944 – "The International Comparison of Industrial Output".

Snow died on 28 August 1959.

== Early life ==
Snow was the son of Henry and Margaret Snow, of Woodford, Essex He was educated at East London College. In 1902 he acquired an Open Mathematical Scholarship at The Queen's College, Oxford. In 1905 he obtained a First Class in Moderations and in 1906 a First Class in the final Mathematics School.

In September 1907, Snow took up an appointment as full-time Lecturer in Mathematics at the Sir John Cass College.

== Academia ==
In 1911 the Senate of the University of London approved the recognition of Snow as a Teacher of the University in Mathematics.

In 1912 Snow was awarded a D.Sc for his thesis – "The Intensity of Natural Selection in Man" and other papers. From 1912 to 1915, Snow was a part-time postgraduate student at University College. He engaged on research in association with Karl Pearson.

In 1915 Snow was asked by the War Office to assist temporarily with statistical work in the Allies' Commission Section of the Army Contracts Department. As his responsibilities at the War Office increased, his work at the College diminished until by mid-1918 he was lecturing only two or three evenings a week.

== Contribution to the leather industry ==
His work at the War Office, Leather Control, so impressed the tanners that in 1919 he was asked to take over the management of the United Tanners' Federation, of which he later became Director.

Snow was appointed Leather Controller, a position he held from 1939 to 1946. He returned as Director of the Federation until he retired in 1953. This was only a partial retirement as he continued to hold several subsidiary appointments until October 1958, the most important being that of Secretary of the International Council of Tanners, a body which he had been largely instrumental in forming in 1926 and in reviving after the Second World War.

When, in 1939, just before the Second World War, the Board of Trade was considering plans for Controls in "a possible emergency" they turned to Snow as Controller-designate. When it became necessary to put the machinery into action, the Controller was informed that Leather Control would be located at Burton-on-Trent.

Snow realised, far more clearly than the official machine, that so long as the Government and the general direction of policy was centred on London, Leather Control could only be conducted efficiently if the Controller remained in London. He turned a blind eye to official pressure and bombing alike and stayed put.

When, in 1943, a crisis in hide supplies for the U.S.A., Canada and the U.K. loomed ahead, Snow put forward a formula for sharing the available supplies, which was duly passed on to the Americans where it met with a frigid reception. A mission of five came over to negotiate, with an open mind on all possible solutions except one – the Snow formula. Three weeks later they returned, quite content to have eaten their words; the Snow formula operated un-criticised until allocations finally ceased – a tribute to the Controller's ability and persuasiveness.

He returned as Director of the Federation until 1953. Amongst other appointments, he became Secretary of the International Council of Tanners, a body which he had been largely instrumental in forming in 1926 and in reviving after the Second World War.

== Contribution to the Royal Statistical Society ==
Snow was elected a Fellow of the Royal Statistical Society in 1910.

In 1930 Snow was appointed Joint Honorary Secretary of the Royal Statistical Society.

In 1935, when he already had seven papers to his name, Dr Snow was awarded the Guy Medal in Silver.

Snow was appointed President of the Royal Statistical Society in 1943 and served until 1945.

Snow was the 26th President in the 20th century, the four preceding Presidents were Arthur Lyon Bowley, Henry William Macrosty, Hector Leak, and William Beveridge. The four Presidents that followed Snow were The Lord Woolton, David Heron, Sir Geoffrey Heyworth, and Austin Bradford Hill.

Apart from his inaugural Presidential Address, Snow read nine papers before the Society.

In addition to the papers to the Society, Snow also contributed papers to Biometrika such as "The Application of the Correlation Coefficient to Mendilian Distributions" and Proceedings, such as "The influence of selection and assortative mating on the ancestral and fraternal correlations of a mendelian population"

Snow also wrote several articles including "On the Magnitude of the Population of England and Wales Available for Emigration", "The Limits of Industrial Employment", "The Statistical Basis of Export Targets", "Some Statistical Problems Suggested by the Sickness and Mortality Data of Certain of the Large Friendly Societies", "Trade Forecasting and Prices", "The Application of the Method of Multiple Correlation to the Estimation of Post-Censal Populations", and "Note on the Future Population of the Self-Governing Portion of the British Empire".

John Aldrich (Economics Division. School of Social Sciences. University of Southampton) in his paper: "Mathematics in the London Royal Statistical Society 1834-1934" for the Journal Electronique d'Histoire des Probabilités et de la Statistique refers to Dr Snow's contributions over 30 times.

When Snow died on 28 August 1959, his obituary was published by the Royal Statistical Society.
