= Robert Nicholas Curnow =

British statistician

Robert Nicholas Curnow was born in 1933. In 1992, Curnow was awarded the Guy Medal in Silver.

In 1997 Curnow was appointed President of the Royal Statistical Society. He served until 1999. During his term of office, Curnow contributed to the Green Paper "Statistics: a matter of trust" (Treasury, 1998a) and "Your right to know" (Treasury, 1998b).

Curnow is co-author of 146 publications. His last was “How phenotypic matching based on neutral mating cues enables speciation in locally adapted populations” in November 2019.

Academic offices
Preceded by T. M. F. Smith, D. J. Bartholomew, Adrian Smith (statistician)	Robert Nicholas Curnow President of the Royal Statistical Society; 1997–1999	Succeeded by Denise Lievesley, Peter Green (statistician), Andy Grieve
