= Fiona Steele =

British statistician

Fiona Alison Steele, CBE, FBA is a British statistician. Since 2013, she has been Professor of Statistics at the London School of Economics (LSE).

After graduating with a degree in mathematics and statistics from the University of Edinburgh in 1992, Steele completed her master's degree (in 1993) and doctorate in statistics (in 1996) at the University of Southampton. She then joined the LSE as a lecturer in statistics and research methodology. She was appointed to a research lectureship at the Institute of Education in 2001. In 2005 moved to the University of Bristol to be a reader in social statistics; she was promoted to professor three years later. Steele was also Director of Bristol's Centre for Multilevel Modelling from 2010 until she took up her post at the LSE in 2013. According to her British Academy profile, her research relates to the "development and application of statistical methods for the analysis of longitudinal data, including multilevel event history models and simultaneous equation models" and their "applications in demography and education".

== Honours ==
In 2008, Steele was awarded the Royal Statistical Society's Guy Medal in Bronze. The following year she was elected a Fellow of the British Academy (FBA), the United Kingdom's national academy for the humanities and social sciences. She was appointed Officer of the Order of the British Empire (OBE) in the 2011 New Year Honours for services to social science and Commander of the Order of the British Empire (CBE) in the 2022 Birthday Honours for services to statistics in the social sciences.

== Selected works ==
- (Co-authored with P. Clarke, G. Leckie, J. Allan and D. W. Johnston) "Multilevel structural equation models for longitudinal data where predictors are measured more frequently than outcomes: an application to the effects of stress on cognitive function of nurses", Journal of the Royal Statistical Society, Series A (2016).
- (Co-authored with R. French and M. Bartley) "Adjusting for selection bias in longitudinal analyses of the relationship between employment transitions and health using simultaneous equations modelling", Epidemiology, vol. 24, no. 5 (2013), pp. 703–11.
- (Co-authored with P. Clarke and E. Washbrook) "Modelling household decisions using longitudinal data from household panel surveys, with applications to residential mobility", Sociological Methodology, vol. 43, no. 1 (2013), pp. 225–76.
- (Co-authored with J. Rasbash and J. Jenkins) "A multilevel simultaneous equations model for within-cluster dynamic effects, with an application to reciprocal parent-child and sibling effects", Psychological Methods, vol. 18, no. 1 (2013), pp. 87–100.
- (Co-authored with W. Sigle-Rushton and Ø. Kravdal) "Consequences of family disruption on children's educational outcomes in Norway", Demography, vol. 46, no. 3 (2009), pp. 553–74.
- (Co-authored with D. J. Bartholomew, I. Moustaki, and J. Galbraith) Analysis of Multivariate Social Science Data, 2nd edition (CRC Press, 2008).
