= Stephen Buckland =

British statistician and professor

- Born: Stephen Terrence Buckland; 28 July 1955 (age 71); Dorset, England, United Kingdom
- Education: University of Southampton; University of Edinburgh; University of Aberdeen
- Awards: Fellow of the International Statistical Institute, Fellow of the Royal Society of Edinburgh, Royal Statistical Society’s Guy Medal in Gold
- Scientific career
- Fields: Spatial statistics Quantitative ecology
- Workplaces: Scripps Institution of Oceanography; James Hutton Institute; University of St Andrews
- Doctoral advisor: David Kerridge
- Doctoral students: Rachel Fewster

Stephen Terrence Buckland (born 28 July 1955) is a British statistician and professor at the University of St Andrews. He is best known for his work on distance sampling, a widely used technique for estimating the size of animal populations. He has also made significant contributions in the following areas: bootstrap resampling methods; modelling the dynamics of wild animal populations and measuring biodiversity.

== Biography ==
Buckland was born in Dorset, England, the youngest of three children. After secondary education at Foster's School, Sherborne, he studied mathematics at the University of Southampton and the University of Edinburgh, followed by a PhD in statistics from the University of Aberdeen in 1983. He had a keen interest in natural history from a young age, and now has a strong interest in wildlife photography. He became “Photographer in Residence” at Tentsmuir National Nature Reserve in 2018.

== Academic career ==
From 1977 to 1985 he was lecturer in statistics, University of Aberdeen. He then became senior scientist at the Inter-American Tropical Tuna Commission, based at Scripps Institution of Oceanography in San Diego, California, estimating trends in dolphin abundance in the eastern tropical Pacific, to assess the impacts of tuna fisheries on dolphin stocks. In 1988 he accepted the post of statistician at Scottish Agricultural Statistics Service (now Biomathematics and Statistics Scotland), based at the Macaulay Land Use Research Institute (now the James Hutton Institute).

In 1993 he was appointed professor of statistics, University of St Andrews, and still holds the position as of 2019.

At St Andrews, he established the Centre for Research into Ecological and Environmental Modelling (CREEM) in 1999, and was its Director from 1999 to 2004, and again from 2009 to 2014. He co-founded the National Centre for Statistical Ecology (NCSE) in 2005, with Byron Morgan at the University of Kent, and Steve Brooks, then at the University of Cambridge. He was Director or co-director until 2019.

With others he established the biennial International Statistical Ecology Conferences, with both the first conference (in 2008) and the sixth conference (in 2018) hosted by St Andrews.

Buckland has published around 190 refereed papers spanning statistics, mathematics, ecology, conservation, wildlife management, experimental and theoretical biology, fisheries, environmental science, botany, zoology, geography, geology, epidemiology, agroforestry, remote sensing and analytical chemistry. He is one of the developers of distance sampling methods, and is first author on four books on the subject. Buckland was editor of the Journal of Agricultural, Biological and Environmental Statistics from 2016 to 2018.

== Awards ==
Buckland was elected a Fellow of the International Statistical Institute in 1995 and a Fellow of the Royal Society of Edinburgh in 2007. He was a Leverhulme Trust Research Fellow in 2005–06. He was a Member of the Council of the Royal Statistical Society during 2005–09. In 2019, he was awarded the Royal Statistical Society's Guy Medal in Gold, the 38th recipient since its inception in 1892.

== Selected publications ==
=== Books authored ===
- S. T. Buckland, D. R. Anderson, K. P. Burnham and J. L. Laake (1993). Distance Sampling: Estimating Abundance of Biological Populations. Chapman and Hall, London.
- S. T. Buckland, D. R. Anderson, K. P. Burnham, J. L. Laake, D. L. Borchers and L. Thomas (2001). Introduction to Distance Sampling. Oxford University Press, Oxford.
- D. L. Borchers, S. T. Buckland and W. Zucchini (2002). Estimating Animal Abundance: Closed Populations. Springer Verlag, London. ISBN 9781852335601.
- K. B. Newman, S. T. Buckland, B. J. T Morgan, R. King, D. L. Borchers, D. J. Cole, P. Besbeas, O. Gimenez and L. Thomas (2014). Modelling population dynamics: model formulation, fitting and assessment using state-space methods. Springer, New York.
- S. T. Buckland, E. A. Rexstad, T. A. Marques, and C. S. Oedekoven (2015). Distance Sampling: Methods and Applications. Springer, New York.

=== Books edited ===
- Buckland, S. T.; Bell, M. V.; Picozzi, and N., eds. (1990). The Birds of North East Scotland. North East Scotland Bird Club, Aberdeen.
- S. T. Buckland, D. R. Anderson, K.P. Burnham, J. L. Laake, D. L. Borchers and L. Thomas (eds) (2004). Advanced Distance Sampling. Oxford University Press, Oxford.

=== Selected journal articles ===
- N. H. Augustin, M. A. Mugglestone and S. T. Buckland (1996). "An autologistic model for the spatial distribution of wildlife". Journal of Applied Ecology. 33 (2): 339–347. Bibcode:1996JApEc..33..339A. doi:10.2307/2404755. JSTOR 2404755.
- S. T. Buckland, K. P. Burnham and N. H. Augustin (1997). "Model selection: an integral part of inference". Biometrics. 53 (2): 603–618. doi:10.2307/2533961. JSTOR 2533961.
- L. Thomas, S. T. Buckland, E. A. Rexstad, J. L. Laake, S. Strindberg, S. L. Hedley, J. R. B. Bishop, T. A. Marques and K. P. Burnham (2010). "Distance software: design and analysis of distance sampling surveys for estimating population size". Journal of Applied Ecology. 47 (1): 5–14. Bibcode:2010JApEc..47....5T. doi:10.1111/j.1365-2664.2009.01737.x. PMC 2847204. PMID 20383262.
