= Thomas A. Welton =

Thomas Abercrombie Welton FSS (1835 – 16 January 1918) was an English statistician and chartered accountant. He received a Guy Medal in Silver from the Royal Statistical Society in 1901.

Welton was born in Hackney, the son of Nicholas and Harriet Welton. He was baptised at St John's Church in Hackney on 20 February 1835.

Welton was vice president of the Inspection Committee of Trustee Savings Bank for 25 years before his death in 1918, at which point his friend Sir Edward Brabrook eulogised him in The Times, writing that "his wisdom and sympathetic insight have been of the highest value to his colleagues and to the excellent institution with which that committee is concerned."
