= Ernest Snow =

Ernest Snow may refer to:

- Ernest A. Snow (1876–1927), American jurist.
- Ernest Charles Snow (1886–1959), British statistician
