= Brabrook =

Brabrook is a surname. Notable people with the surname include:

- Edward Brabrook (1839–1930), English civil servant, writer, and anthropologist
- Peter Brabrook (1937–2016), English footballer
