= Joseph Oscar Irwin =

British statistician (1898–1982)

- Born: 17 December 1898; London, UK
- Died: 27 July 1982 (aged 83); Schaffhausen, Switzerland
- Education: University of Cambridge; University College London
- Known for: Irwin–Hall distribution
- Scientific career
- Workplaces: Rothamsted Experimental Station; University of Cambridge; London School of Hygiene & Tropical Medicine; University College London
- Doctoral advisor: Ronald Fisher; Karl Pearson
- Notable students: Oscar Kempthorne

Joseph Oscar Irwin (17 December 1898 – 27 July 1982) was a British statistician who advanced the use of statistical methods in biological assay and other fields of laboratory medicine. Irwin's grasp of modern mathematical statistics distinguished him not only from older medical statisticians like Major Greenwood but contemporaries like Austin Bradford Hill. Irwin proposed the concept of restricted mean survival time in 1949 to quantify survival up to a fixed observation interval.

== Biography ==
Irwin was born in London. He attended the City of London School where he specialised in classics and then at a late date in mathematics. In December 1917 he won a scholarship to Christ's College, Cambridge to read mathematics. A serious illness disqualified him from war service but he spent a year computing anti-aircraft trajectories for Karl Pearson. When Irwin graduated from Cambridge in 1921 he joined Pearson's department of applied statistics at University College London, which had returned to its normal activities. Irwin published his first work there, including his 1927 paper on the distribution of means.

In 1928, Irwin moved to Rothamsted Experimental Station and he stayed there until 1931. His old boss Pearson and his new boss Ronald Fisher were bitter enemies but Irwin's conciliatory nature allowed him to remain on good terms with both men. At Rothamsted he continued to work on mathematical statistics and he became one of the first people to master Fisher's innovations.

Irwin made an important contribution to the dissemination of Fisher's ideas by writing expository pieces. In his appreciation Greenberg recalls the mathematical statisticians R. C. Bose and S. N. Roy telling him how by reading Irwin they been able to understand Fisher. Another valuable educational project was the series of papers "Recent Advances in Mathematical Statistics" which Irwin inaugurated in 1931.

From 1931 until his retirement in 1965, Irwin worked for the Medical Research Council at the London School of Hygiene and Tropical Medicine. Besides doing his own research he was a consultant on technical statistical matters. There was a break in the Second World War when Irwin was responsible for the teaching of statistics at Cambridge. For many mathematicians, including Dennis Lindley, Peter Armitage, and Oscar Kempthorne, Irwin's course was the first step to becoming statisticians.

At the MRC, Irwin wrote a series of important papers on bioassay. An important theoretical contribution was his 1935 paper on "Fisher's exact test". Irwin had done the work in 1933, apparently preceding the better known work of Fisher and Yates. After the war Irwin embarked on a number of long-term collaborative studies, often for official committees. These were applied studies but he continued to work on more mathematical problems, e.g. he produced a series of papers on the generalized Waring distribution.

Irwin received many honours and served as president of the Royal Statistical Society in 1962–64; he had played an important part in the affairs of the society for many years.

Greenberg has described the man

J. O. Irwin was a soft spoken kind soul who took a tremendous interest in his students and their achievements.... He was a lovable absent-minded kind of professor who smoked more matches than he did tobacco in his ever-present pipe while he was deeply involved in thinking about other important matters.

== Selected publications ==
According to Armitage, Irwin published about 120 papers.

- J. O. Irwin (1927) On the Frequency Distribution of the Means of Samples from a Population Having any Law of Frequency with Finite Moments, with Special Reference to Pearson's Type II, Biometrika Vol. 19, pp. 225–239.
- J. O. Irwin (1931) Recent Advances in Mathematical Statistics, Journal of the Royal Statistical Society, Vol. 94, pp. 568–578
- J. O. Irwin (1935) Tests of Significance for Differences between Percentages Based on Small Numbers, Metron, Vol. 12, pp. 83–94.
- J. O. Irwin (1963) Sir Ronald Aylmer Fisher, 1890–1962, Journal of the Royal Statistical Society. Series A, Vol. 126, pp. 159–162.
- J. O. Irwin (1975) The Generalized Waring Distribution. Part I, Journal of the Royal Statistical Society. Series A (General), Vol. 138, pp. 18–31.

== See also ==
- Irwin–Hall distribution
