= Peter Diggle =

British statistitican

Peter John Diggle
- Born: 24 February 1950 (age 76); Lancashire, United Kingdom
- Education: University of Liverpool; University of Oxford; Newcastle University
- Known for: Spatial Statistics; Longitudinal Data; Time-series analysis
- Scientific career
- Fields: Statistics
- Workplaces: Newcastle University; University of Lancaster
- Thesis: Spatial Processes with Applications in Ecology (1977)
- Academic advisors: Julian Besag

Peter John Diggle (born 24 February 1950, in Lancashire, England) is a British statistician. He holds concurrent appointments with the Faculty of Health and Medicine at Lancaster University, and the Institute of Infection and Global Health at the University of Liverpool. From 2004 to 2008 he was an EPSRC Senior Research Fellow. He is one of the founding co-editors of the journal Biostatistics.

Previously, he has held positions at Newcastle University, and the Commonwealth Scientific and Industrial Research Organisation in Australia. He also holds honorary appointments with Johns Hopkins, Columbia and Yale.

== Early life and education ==
He attended school in Scotland, where he discovered his affinity and aptitude in mathematics.

Diggle originally attended Edinburgh University to study mathematics, but halfway through, he was transferred to the University of Liverpool, where he studied "Computational and Statistical Science" (B.Sc. 1972). Under the tutelage of Julian Besag, he began to gain an interest in statistics.

He matriculated at the University of Oxford and in 1973, gained his masters in statistics, by thesis "Contagion and Allied Processes" (M.Sc., 1973). After completion of his masters, Diggle enrolled in a PhD programme at Newcastle-upon-Tyne, where he gained his doctorate in 1977 in statistics by thesis, with the research topic "Spatial Processes with Applications in Ecology".

== Academic career ==
From 1974 to 1983, Peter held a lectureship at Newcastle University for statistics before becoming a reader for the duration of 1984. While at Newcastle, he went under Robin Plackett’s wing, whose obituary he wrote.

Spatial statistics was still a relatively new field in the 70s. Peter took part in organising conferences for this field. Virtually everyone in the country who worked in spatial statistics (between 30 – 50 people) would attend these conferences in Newcastle.

He worked in the CSIRO division for Mathematics and Statistics in Australia. He started as a senior research scientist from 1985 – 1986. Then, from 1986 – 1987, he became a chief research scientist until his promotion to Chief of Division from 1987 – 1988. From 1988 – 2007, he became a professor of statistics at Lancaster University.

== Societal recognition ==
He was awarded the Guy Medal in Silver by the Royal Statistical Society in 1997 and the Guy Medal in Gold in 2024.

His works have been recognised by many statistical societies, but some of the most notable recognitions are:

- Presidency of the Royal Statistical Society from 2014 – 2016, starting his term early on the resignation of John Pullinger who was appointed National Statistician. He also started a fundraising campaign to send RSS fellows to teach MSc courses in statistics for Tanzanian students at the African Institute for Mathematical Sciences (AIMS) in 2016.
- Being invited to give talks all around the world at the International Statistical Institute from 1983 – 2011.
- Holding a post at the board of trustees at Biometrika since 1993.

== Research ==
Diggle's main methodological research interests are in spatial statistics, longitudinal data analysis and environmental epidemiology. Most of his research is motivated by applications in the biomedical, clinical or health sciences. Diggle has a particular interest in real-time health surveillance and in tropical disease epidemiology. He also leads the CHICAS research group (a research group at the University of Lancaster).

== COVID-19 ==
In April 2020, the RSS formed a COVID-19 task force. The task force is using their statistical expertise to help with COVID data collection and analysis. Peter Diggle is part of this task force.

== Seminal works ==
Professor Peter Diggle has authored a range of texts detailing methods in geostatistics. Below are titles of some of his most influential work:

- Statistics and scientific method: an introduction for students and researchers. Diggle, P., Chetwynd, A. 2011 New York : Oxford University Press. 172 p. ISBN 9780199543199. Book
- Model-based Geostatistics. Diggle, P.J., Ribeiro, P.J. 03/2007 New York, USA : Springer. 228 p. ISBN 0387329072 978–0387329079. Book
- Handbook of spatial statistics Gelfand, A., Diggle, P., Guttorp, P., Fuentes, M. 2010 CRC Press. 619 p. ISBN 978-1420072877. Book
- Statistical analysis of spatial point patterns. Diggle, P.J. 2003 London : Edward Arnold. 159 p. ISBN 0340740701. Book
- Time series: a biostatistical introduction Diggle, P. 1990 Oxford : Oxford University Press. 257 p. ISBN 0198522061. Book
- Discrete mathematics. Chetwynd, A.G., Diggle, P.J. 1995 London : Arnold. 209 p. ISBN 0340610476. Book
