= Herbert Edward Soper =

British statistician

Herbert Edward Soper (1865 – 1930) was a British statistician, who worked with Karl Pearson. He was awarded the Guy Medal in Silver of the Royal Statistical Society in 1930. He had an obituary in the Journal of the Royal Statistical Society.
