= Steffen Lauritzen =

Danish statistician (born 1947)

- Born: April 22, 1947 (age 79)
- Citizenship: Danish
- Education: University of Copenhagen
- Awards: Guy Medal (Silver, 1996)
- Scientific career
- Fields: Mathematical Statistics
- Workplaces: University of Copenhagen; Aalborg University; University of Oxford
- Website: http://web.math.ku.dk/~lauritzen/

Steffen Lilholt Lauritzen FRS (born 22 April 1947) is former Head of the Department of Statistics at the University of Oxford and Fellow of Jesus College, Oxford, and currently emeritus Professor of Statistics at the University of Copenhagen. He is a leading proponent of mathematical statistics and graphical models.

== Education and career ==
Lauritzen studied statistics at the University of Copenhagen, Denmark, completing the degree of Candidatus statisticae (M.Sc. level) in 1972 and Licentiatus statisticae (PhD level) in 1975. He was appointed there as lecturer of Statistics and remained until 1981. He continued as Professor of Mathematics and Statistics at Aalborg University, Denmark, from 1981 to 2004. From 2004 to 2014 he was Professor of Statistics at the University of Oxford, from 2014 to 2021, he was Professor of Statistics at the University of Copenhagen, and since 2021, he is emeritus Professor of Statistics there.

== Honors and awards ==
Lauritzen was elected a member of the International Statistical Institute in 1984, and a Fellow of the Royal Society in 2011.

Lauritzen was awarded the 1996 Guy Medal in Silver by the Royal Statistical Society. He served, among others, as Editor-in-Chief of the Scandinavian Journal of Statistics from 1998 to 2000.

Lauritzen's book Probabilistic Networks and Expert Systems (1999, Springer-Verlag), written jointly with Robert G. Cowell, Philip Dawid, and David Spiegelhalter, received the 2001 DeGroot Prize from the International Society for Bayesian Analysis.

== Selected publications ==
- Spiegelhalter, David J., A. Philip Dawid, Steffen L. Lauritzen and Robert G. Cowell "Bayesian analysis in expert systems" in Statistical Science, 8(3), 1993.
- A. Philip Dawid, Uffe Kjærulff, Steffen L. Lauritzen, "Hybrid Propagation in Junction Trees." IPMU 1994
