= Gareth Roberts (statistician) =

British statistician

- Born: Gareth Owen Roberts; 1964 (age 61–62)
- Education: Jesus College, Oxford; University of Warwick
- Awards: Guy Medal (Bronze, 1997) (Silver, 2008); Fellow of the Royal Society (2013)
- Scientific career
- Fields: Markov chain Monte Carlo (MCMC)
- Workplaces: University of Warwick; University of Lancaster; University of Cambridge; University of Nottingham; University of Oxford
- Thesis: Some boundary hitting problems for diffusion processes (1988)
- Doctoral advisor: Saul Jacka
- Doctoral students: Steve Brooks
- Website: www2.warwick.ac.uk/fac/sci/statistics/staff/academic-research/roberts

Gareth Owen Roberts FRS FLSW (born 1964) is a statistician and applied probabilist. He is Professor of Statistics in the Department of Statistics and Director of the Centre for Research in Statistical Methodology (CRiSM) at the University of Warwick. He is an established authority on the stability of Markov chains, especially applied to Markov chain Monte Carlo (MCMC) theory methodology for a wide range of latent statistical models with applications in spatial statistics, infectious disease epidemiology and finance.

== Education ==
Roberts was educated at Liverpool Blue Coat School and Jesus College, Oxford, graduating in 1985 in Mathematics and subsequently went on to complete in 1988 a PhD thesis on Some boundary hitting problems for diffusion processes under the supervision of Saul Jacka at the University of Warwick.

== Career ==
Following his PhD, Roberts held various academic positions at the University of Nottingham, the University of Cambridge and Lancaster University before returning to the University of Warwick. He was a Fellow of St Catharine's College, Cambridge from 1992 to 1998.

Roberts is a talented tournament bridge player, whose achievements include winning the Great Northern Swiss Pairs in 1997, and the Garden Cities Trophy in 2008 and 2013.

== Awards and honours ==
- 1995 – Raybould Fellowship
- 1997 – Royal Statistical Society's Guy medal in Bronze
- 1999 – Rollo Davidson Prize of the University of Cambridge
- 2004 – ISI highly cited researcher (Mathematics: Ranked 16th)
- 2008 – Royal Statistical Society's Guy medal in Silver
- 2009 – Institute of Mathematical Statistics Medallion
- 2010 – Editor of Journal of the Royal Statistical Society (Series B)
- 2013 – Elected a Fellow of the Royal Society
- 2019 - Elected a Fellow of the Learned Society of Wales

His nomination to become a Fellow of the Royal Society (FRS) in 2013 reads:

"Gareth Roberts is distinguished for his work spanning Applied Probability, Bayesian Statistics and Computational Statistics. He has made fundamental contributions to the theory, methodology and application of Markov chain Monte Carlo and related methods in Statistics. He has developed crucial convergence and stability theory, constructed a theory of optimal scaling for Metropolis–Hastings algorithms, and has introduced and explored the theory of adaptive MCMC algorithms. He has made pioneering contributions to infinite dimensional simulation problems and inference in stochastic processes. His work has already found practical application in the study of epidemics such as Avian Influenza and Foot and Mouth disease."

- 2015 – Wolfson Research Merit Award from the Royal Society
