= Jonathan Tawn =

Statistician

- Education: University of Surrey; Imperial College London
- Spouse: Julia Tawn (m. 1988)
- Children: Nicholas Tawn; Georgina Tawn
- Awards: Guy Medal in Bronze (1993),Guy Medal in Silver (2024)
- Scientific career
- Workplaces: Lancaster University; University of Surrey; University of Sheffield
- Doctoral advisor: Richard L. Smith
- Website: www.maths.lancs.ac.uk/~tawn/

Jonathan Tawn is Distinguished Professor of Statistics at Lancaster University. He is one of the leading researchers in Extreme value theory, looking into both methods and applications in areas such as oceanography, hydrology, and climatology.

== Career ==
Tawn received a BSc in Mathematics from Imperial College London in 1985 and a PhD in Statistics from the University of Surrey in 1988, under the supervision of Richard L. Smith.

After four years at the department of Probability and Statistics at Sheffield, Tawn joined Lancaster University in 1992 as a senior lecturer, and was promoted to professor in 1996.

In 2001 he was selected as one of the twenty "Faces of Mathematics", a project looking into the lives of some of the UK's most influential researchers in Mathematics.

Tawn was singled out by the journal Nature in 2015 for his research on the design of ship hatches.

== Awards ==
Tawn was the recipient of the Royal Statistical Society's Guy Medal Silver in 2024 and Bronze in 1993, and in 2015 was the inaugural winner of the society's Barnett Award for outstanding contribution to the field of Environmental Statistics.
