= Major Greenwood =

English epidemiologist and statistician (1880–1949)

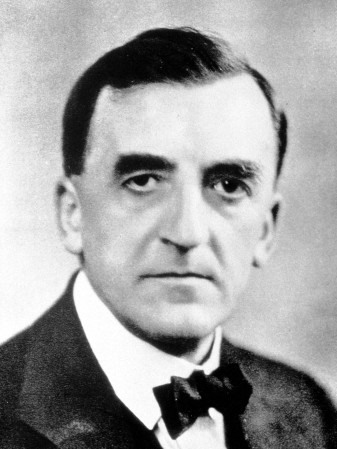
- Major Greenwood
- Born: 9 August 1880; Shoreditch, London, England
- Died: 5 October 1949 (aged 69); London, England
- Citizenship: British
- Education: University College London; London Hospital; London School of Hygiene and Tropical Medicine
- Known for: Greenwood statistic
- Awards: Weldon Memorial Prize (1926)
- Scientific career
- Fields: Epidemiology
- Workplaces: London Hospital Medical College; Lister Institute; Ministry of Health; London School of Hygiene and Tropical Medicine

Major Greenwood FRS (9 August 1880 – 5 October 1949) was a British epidemiologist and statistician.

== Life and career ==
Greenwood was born in Shoreditch in London's East End, the only child of Major Greenwood, a physician in general practice there ("Major" was his forename, not a military rank.) and his wife Annie, daughter of Peter Lodwick Burchell, F.R.C.S., M.B., L.S.A. The Greenwood family is recorded back to the twelfth century in the person of Wyomarus Greenwode, of Greenwode Leghe, near Heptonstall, Yorkshire, caterer to the Empress Maude in 1154. Greenwood was educated on the classical side at Merchant Taylors' School and went on to study medicine at University College London and the London Hospital. On qualifying in 1904 he worked for a time as assistant to his father but after a few months he gave up clinical practice for good.

He went to work as a demonstrator for the physiologist Leonard Hill (father of the future statistician Austin Bradford Hill) at the London Hospital Medical College. Leonard Hill recalled, "By recognising the ability of a student with nothing behind him to show his worth and by appointing him my assistant I may claim to have started Greenwood on his career." While Greenwood made a good start in physiological research he was already drawn to statistics; his first paper in Biometrika appeared in 1904. After a period of study with Karl Pearson he was appointed statistician to the Lister Institute in 1910. There he worked on a wide range of problems, including a study of the effectiveness of inoculation with the statistician Udny Yule. In the First World War Greenwood first served in the Royal Army Medical Corps but then was put in charge of a medical research unit at the Ministry of Munitions. There he investigated the health problems associated with factory work, one result of which was an influential study of accidents which he produced with Yule. In 1919 Greenwood joined the newly created Ministry of Health with responsibility for medical statistics. He co-authored a number of papers (see publications) with Ethel Newbold during his tenure there (and wrote a touching obituary for her on her early death in 1933). In 1928 he became the first professor of Epidemiology and Vital Statistics at the London School of Hygiene and Tropical Medicine where he stayed until he retired in 1945. He appointed a group of researchers, of whom the most important was Austin Bradford Hill. Greenwood played the same role in Hill's career as Hill's father had played in his.

Greenwood lived at Loughton, where among his neighbours were Sir Frank Baines, Millais Culpin, and Leonard Erskine Hill.

== Honors and awards ==
The Royal Society awarded the Buchanan Medal to Greenwood in 1927, and elected him a Fellow in 1928. The election certificate stated

Engaged in medical research. Has applied the statistical method to the elucidation of many problems of physiology, pathology, hygiene and epidemiology. Is the author, or joint author, of more than sixty papers dealing with these applications, including important contributions to the experimental study of epidemiology (Journ Hyg, 24, 1925, Greenwood and Topley; ibid, 25, 1926, Greenwood, Newbold, Topley and Wilson). Has done much to encourage and develop the use of modern statistical methods by medical laboratory investigators, and, as Chairman of the Medical Research Council's Statistical Committee, to secure the adequate planning and execution of field investigations.

He was elected President of the Royal Statistical Society in 1934 and awarded its Guy Medal in Gold in 1945.

== Research ==
Greenwood produced a large body of research, was the first holder of important positions in modern medical statistics and wrote extensively on the history of his subject, but as Austin Bradford Hill wrote in his obituary, "in the future, it may well indeed seem that one of his greatest contributions, if not the greatest, lay merely in his outlook, in his statistical approach to medicine, then a new approach and one long regarded with suspicion. And he fought this fight continuously and honestly—for logic for accuracy, for 'little sums.'"

His name is attached to the Greenwood formula for the variance or standard error (SE) of the Kaplan–Meier estimator of survival.

A statistical method invented by Major Greenwood in a statistical study of infectious diseases is still used in present-day research. The Greenwood statistic was used to discover that there is some kind of order in the placement of genes on the chromosomes of living things and this inspired a new look at epigenetics, which is now considered to be as important as genetics in how living organisms develop and evolve.

== Publications ==
- Greenwood, M. (1904). "A First Study of the Weight, Variability, and Correlation of the Human Viscera, with Special Reference to the Healthy and Diseased Heart". Biometrika. 3: 63–83. doi:10.1093/biomet/3.1.63.
- Greenwood, M. (1910). Physiology of the special senses. London: E. Arnold.
- Greenwood, M; Yule, G. U. (1915). "The Statistics of Anti-typhoid and Anti-cholera Inoculations, and the Interpretation of such Statistics in general". Proceedings of the Royal Society of Medicine. 8 (Sect Epidemiol State Med): 113–94. doi:10.1177/003591571500801433. PMC 2004181. PMID 19978918.
- Greenwood, Major & Udny Yule, G. (1920). "An Inquiry into the Nature of Frequency Distributions Representative of Multiple Happenings with Particular Reference to the Occurrence of Multiple Attacks of Disease or of Repeated Accidents". Journal of the Royal Statistical Society. 83 (2): 255–279. doi:10.2307/2341080. JSTOR 2341080.\
- Edgar L. Collis and Major Greenwood. The health of the industrial worker. 1921
- Cripps, L, Greenwood, M. and Newbold, E (1923). "A Biometric Study of the Inter-relations of `Vital Capacity' stature, stem length and weight in a Sample of Healthy Male Adults". Biometrika. 14: 3–4. doi:10.2307/2331816. JSTOR 2331816.
- Greenwood, M.; Newbold, E (1923). "On the Estimation of Metabolism from Determination of Carbon Dioxyde Production and on Estimation of External Work from Respiratory Metabolism". J. Hygiene. 21: 3–4. doi:10.1017/s0022172400031624. PMC 2167379 .
- Greenwood, M.; Newbold, E (1927). "Practical Applications of Statistics of Repeated Events, particularly to Industrial Accidents". J. Royal Stat. Society. 90: 487–547. doi:10.2307/2341203. JSTOR 2341203.
- Major Greenwood. The natural duration of cancer. London, England: His Majesty’s Stationery Office, Reports on Public Health and Medical Subjects, No. 33. 1926
- Major Greenwood. Epidemics and crowd-diseases: an introduction to the study of epidemiology. 1935
- Major Greenwood. Medical statistics from Graunt to Farr: the Fitzpatrick lectures for the years 1941 and 1943. 1948
