= Amanda Chetwynd =

British mathematician

Amanda G. Chetwynd PFHEA is a British mathematician and statistician specializing in combinatorics and spatial statistics. She is Professor of Mathematics and Statistics and Provost for Student Experience, Colleges and the Library at Lancaster University, and a Principal Fellow of the Higher Education Academy.

== Education and research ==
Chetwynd earned a Ph.D. from the Open University in 1985. Her dissertation, Edge-colourings of graphs, was jointly supervised by Anthony Hilton and Robin Wilson. She did postdoctoral research at the Stockholm University before joining Lancaster University. Her research interests include graph theory, edge coloring, and latin squares in combinatorics, as well as geographical clustering in medical statistics.

== Recognition and service ==
In 2003, Chetwynd won a National Teaching Fellowship recognizing her teaching excellence. She was vice president of the London Mathematical Society in 2005, at a time when university study of mathematics was shrinking, and as vice president encouraged the UK government to counter the decline by providing more funds for mathematics education.

== Books ==
With Peter Diggle, Chetwynd is the author of the books Discrete Mathematics (Modular Mathematics series, Arnold, 1995) and Statistics and Scientific Method: An Introduction for Students and Researchers (Oxford University Press, 2011). With Bob Burn she is the author of A Cascade of Numbers: An Introduction to Number Theory (Arnold, 1995).
