= Biostatistics (journal) =

- Discipline: Statistics
- Language: English
- Edited by: Dimitris Rizopoulos; Sherri Rose

Publication details
- History: 2000–present
- Publisher: Oxford Journals (United Kingdom)
- Frequency: Quarterly
- Open access: hybrid
- Impact factor: 5.899 (2020)

Standard abbreviations
- ISO 4: Biostatistics

Indexing
- ISSN: 1465-4644 (print); 1468-4357 (web)
- OCLC no.: 972000652

Links
- Journal homepage; Online archive

Biostatistics is a peer-reviewed scientific journal covering biostatistics, that is, statistics for biological and medical research.

The journals that had cited Biostatistics the most by 2008 were Biometrics, Journal of the American Statistical Association, Biometrika, Statistics in Medicine, and Journal of the Royal Statistical Society, Series B.

Scott Zeger and Peter Diggle were the founding editors of Biostatistics.
