= Sherri Rose =

American biostatistician

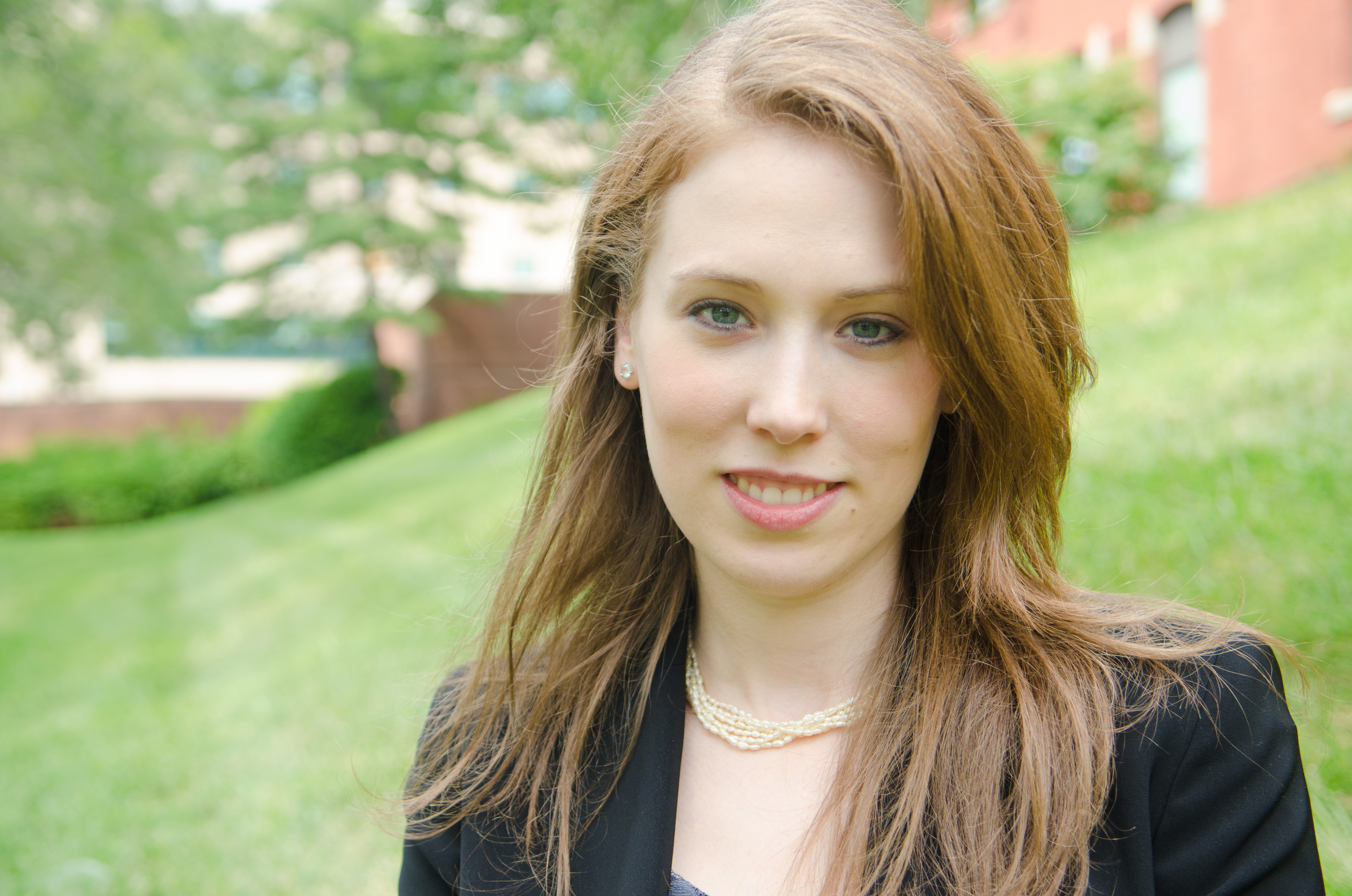
- Born: New Jersey, U.S.

Academic background
- Education: BS, Statistics, 2005, George Washington University; PhD, Biostatistics, 2011, University of California, Berkeley
- Thesis: Causal Inference for Case-Control Studies

Academic work
- Institutions: Stanford University; Harvard University
- Website: drsherrirose.org

Sherri Rose is an American biostatistician. She is an associate professor of health care policy at Stanford University, and once worked at Harvard University. A fellow of the American Statistical Association, she has served as co-editor of Biostatistics since 2019 and Chair of the American Statistical Association’s Biometrics Section. Her research focuses on statistical machine learning for health care policy.

== Early life and education ==
Rose was born and raised in poverty and home violence in Southern New Jersey. She was evicted twice as a child and would often go to bed hungry. Following high school, she attended George Washington University for her Bachelor of Science degree in statistics and the University of California, Berkeley for her PhD in Biostatistics. Rose was originally enrolled in George Washington's pre-med mechanical and aerospace engineering program but chose to change her major to statistics.

While completing her PhD under the guidance of Mark van der Laan, they co-authored a book on machine learning for causal inference titled Targeted Learning: Causal Inference for Observational and Experimental Data. Her work was recognized with the Evelyn Fix Memorial Prize and the Chin-Long Chiang Biostatistics Student of the Year Award.

== Career ==
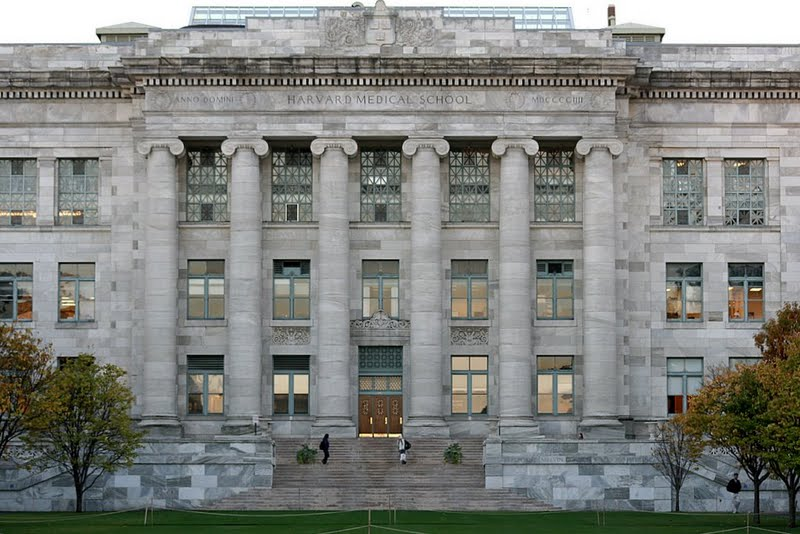
A photo of Harvard Medical School, where Rose worked

Rose completed her postdoctoral research fellowship at Johns Hopkins University (JHU) before joining Harvard Medical School as an assistant professor of Biostatistics. While at JHU, she received their Delta Omega Scholarship and a Young Investigator Award from the International Conference on Advances in Interdisciplinary Statistics and Combinatorics. Following her first year at Harvard, she was elected to join the editorial board of the Journal of the American Statistical Association Theory and Methods as an associate editor. Rose also co-founded the Health Policy Data Science Lab with Laura Hatfield to study spending levels in markets, spending goals for accountable care organizations, and mental health outcomes. She was later elected Secretary/Treasurer of the Biometrics Section of the American Statistical Association and promoted to the role of associate professor.

In her role as an associate professor, Rose continued to study statistical machine learning for health care policy. She published a paper in 2017 which used statistical machine learning to determine health economics and outcomes. The paper demonstrated that "new statistical machine learning methods may be better able to search the claims data used for risk adjustment in order to predict health spending". As a result of her academic research, Rose was the recipient of the inaugural Harvard Data Science Initiative Grant to fund her proposed project "Improving Health Care System Performance: Computational Health Economics with Normative Data for Payment Calibration." Another one of her studies, titled Targeted Maximum Likelihood Estimation for Causal Inference in Observational Studies, was selected as one of the American Journal of Epidemiology and Society for Epidemiologic Research’s 2017 Articles of the Year. In the same year, she was also one of eight Harvard researchers awarded federal funding from the National Institutes of Health’s "High-Risk, High-Reward" research program.

As she approached the end of her tenure at Harvard, Rose became the first women elected co-editor of the peer-reviewed scientific journal Biostatistics. She also published a sequel to her first book with Mark van der Laan and was the recipient of the Bernie J. O’Brien New Investigator Award. In her final year, she was elected a Fellow of the American Statistical Association and awarded the Health Policy Statistics Section Mid-Career Award from the American Statistical Association. Rose eventually left Harvard to join the faculty of health policy at Stanford University.

=== Stanford ===
As an associate professor of medicine at Stanford, Rose was the recipient of the 2021 Gertrude M. Cox Award for her work applying statistics to improve health care. Later that year, she was honored with the Mortimer Spiegelman Award, as a young biostatistician who has made the most significant contributions to public health statistics.

== Personal life ==
Rose is married to Burke, a systems administrator at the University of California, Berkeley.
