= George Henry Wood (statistician) =

George Henry Wood (1874-1945) was a labour statistician, who was a student of and worked with Arthur Bowley.

Born in Bristol, he initially trained as an engineer. He was subsequently appointed to the statistical staff of the Labour Department of the Board of Trade.

He resigned his post at the Labour Department in early 1908 to become Secretary for the Huddersfield and District Woollen Manufacturers and Spinners Association. In 1917 he became secretary to the Woolen and Worsted Trades Federation, a position he held until his death on 11 July 1945. During World War I, he worked in the War Office on statistical matters relating to wool; he acted as chief statistical officer to Wool Control in the Ministry of Supply in World War II.

In 1910 he was awarded the Guy Medal in Silver of the Royal Statistical Society, and was a member of its council from 1926 - 1929.

Wood was a free thinker and was active in a variety of local radical movements in Huddersfield, including the Fabians. He collected wage statistics over a broad field and published much of his collected material.

"E.C.R(hodes)." said in Wood's obituary that "It is impossible, within the limits of a short obituary notice, to do justice to all the varied aspects of Wood's other activities or to his colourful personality. He had a wide range of interests, including the arts, music and (above all) cricket. He had made a close study of the history, and achieved marked success in the art and craft, of wood engraving; making and shaping his own blocks, engraving them, and printing from them with his own press. He had a special enthusiasm for cricket, and had an amazing knowledge of the performances of the more prominent players of this and past generations. Those who were present when he entertained a few Fellows of the Society and leading cricketers after reading his paper on cricket scores in November 1944, will recall with delight the informal discussion which followed, and his exchange of opinions and reminiscences with a distinguished ex-captain of All-England test teams and other first-class cricketers. Wood could be a doughty controversialist, when occasion arose, and his vehement defence of positions to the last ditch was sometimes liable to rouse antagonisms in the minds of those who were only slightly acquainted with him. Those who were privileged to enjoy his friendship, however, will long remember his kindly and generous nature, his staunch loyalty to colleagues and friends, and his invariable readiness to help a lame dog over the stile."

His extensive library, first loaned to Huddersfield Technical College in c.1925, includes manuscript wages material, monographs, pamphlets, government reports and periodicals. The subjects covered include economic and social history, education, health, housing and women's history. His work is archived at Heritage Quay at the University of Huddersfield.

His hobbies included the arts, music and cricket. He studied the history and practical craft of wood engraving, using his own press. His interest in cricket led him to read a paper on cricket scores to the Royal Statistical Society in November 1944
