= Steve Brooks (statistician) =

British statistician

- Born: July 1970
- Education: University of Bristol; University of Kent; University of Cambridge
- Awards: Guy Medal (Bronze, 2005); Philip Leverhulme Prize; RSS Research Prize
- Scientific career
- Fields: Computational and Applied Statistics
- Workplaces: University of Bristol; University of Surrey; University of Cambridge
- Doctoral advisor: Gareth Roberts

Stephen Peter "Steve" Brooks is a British statistician. He is the Executive Director of Select Statistical Services Ltd, a statistical research consultancy company based in Exeter, and former professor of statistics at the Statistical Laboratory of the University of Cambridge.

He received a degree in mathematics from Bristol University in 1991, and a master's degree in statistics from the University of Kent. He received his PhD at Cambridge; his supervisor was Gareth Roberts. Post-graduation he then returned to Bristol as a lecturer in the Statistics Group and then Senior Lecturer at the University of Surrey. In 2000 Brooks returned to Cambridge first as a fellow of King's College, Cambridge. and then of Wolfson College.

He is a specialist in Markov chain Monte Carlo and applied statistical methods.

He is one of the founding directors of the National Centre for Statistical Ecology which was set up in 2005.

He left Cambridge in 2006 to become Director of Research for ATASS Sports and is now executive director of Select Statistical Services Ltd a statistical consultancy firm based in Exeter and the Director of the Exeter Initiative for Statistics and its Applications.

== Career ==
- 1989–1991 Undergraduate, University of Bristol
- 1991–1992 Graduate Student, University of Kent
- 1992–1993 Research Associate, University of Kent
- 1993–1996 Research Student, University of Cambridge
- 1996–1999 Lecturer, University of Bristol
- 1999–2000 Senior Lecturer, University of Surrey
- 2000–2002 Lecturer, University of Cambridge
- 2002–2005 Reader, University of Cambridge
- 2005–2008 Professor, University of Cambridge
- 2006–2011 Director of Research ATASS
- 2011-Executive Director Select Statistical Services Ltd

=== Degrees and Qualifications ===
- 1991 BSc Mathematics, Bristol
- 1992 MSc Statistics, Kent
- 1996 PhD, Cambridge
- 1999 Chartered Statistician
- 2011 Chartered Scientist

=== Honours and awards ===
- 2005 Royal Statistical Society's Guy medal in Bronze
- 2004 Philip Leverhulme Prize
- 1999 Royal Statistical Society's Research prize

== Books ==
1. Handbook of Markov Chain Monte Carlo edited by Steve Brooks, Andrew Gelman, Galin Jones and Xiao-Li Meng; Chapman and Hall/CRC, 2011
2. Bayesian Analysis for Population Ecology by Ruth King, Olivier Gimenez, Byron Morgan and Steve Brooks; Chapman and Hall/CRC, 2009
