= Robin Plackett =

British statistician (1920–2009)

Robin L. Plackett
- Born: Robert Lewis Plackett; 3 September 1920; Liverpool, United Kingdom
- Died: 23 June 2009 (aged 88); Newcastle upon Tyne, United Kingdom
- Known for: Plackett–Burman designs
- Spouse: Carol Plackett
- Children: 3, including Jane Plackett
- Awards: Guy Medal (bronze, 1968) (silver, 1973) (gold, 1987)
- Scientific career
- Fields: Statistics
- Workplaces: Ministry of Supply; National Physical Laboratory; University of Liverpool; Durham University; Newcastle University

Robert "Robin" Lewis Plackett (3 September 1920 – 23 June 2009) was an English statistician best known for his contributions to the history of statistics and to experimental design, most notably the Plackett–Burman designs.

== Early life and education ==
Plackett was born in Liverpool and attended Liverpool Collegiate School from 1932 to 1939. He then attended Clare College, Cambridge, where he graduated in 1942.

== Early career ==
During World War II, Plackett was requested to work for the Ministry of Supply, in SR17 which was a statistical branch. He began to develop a methodology for applying statistical knowledge, and would pass it down to new recruits.

== First scientific paper ==
In 1946, he would publish his first paper which was written jointly with Peter Burman in a journal called Biometrika. The paper, titled "The design of optimum multifactorial experiments", introduced Plackett–Burman experimental designs.

== Academic career ==
In 1947, he became a lecturer at Liverpool University. He would also publish research on the history of statistics. Then, in 1962, he took a short post for the Professor of Statistics at King's College, Durham before the college merged with Newcastle University in 1963.

He was the first professor of statistics at Newcastle University and held the post until his retirement in 1983. In 1987 the Royal Statistical Society awarded him the Guy Medal in Gold, having awarded him both the bronze and silver medals earlier in his career.

He authored several books on statistics, including Principles of Regression Analysis (1960), The Analysis of Categorical Data (1974) and An Introduction to the Interpretation of Quantal Responses in Biology (1979, with P. S. Hewlett).

== Personal life ==
Plackett had a keen interest in climbing. He was married to his wife, Carol, for 65 years. He also had three children: Adam, Jane and Martin.
