= Julian Besag =

British statistician (1945–2010)

Julian Ernst Besag
- Born: 26 March 1945; Loughborough, Leicestershire, UK
- Died: 6 August 2010 (aged 65); Bristol, UK
- Education: University of Birmingham
- Known for: Spatial statistics, image analysis, Markov random fields & MCMC
- Awards: Guy Medal (Silver, 1983); Fellow of the Royal Society (2004)
- Scientific career
- Fields: Statistician
- Workplaces: Universities of Oxford, Liverpool, Durham, Newcastle and Washington
- Academic advisors: M. S. Bartlett

Julian Ernst Besag FRS (26 March 1945 – 6 August 2010) was a British statistician known chiefly for his work in spatial statistics (including its applications to epidemiology, image analysis and agricultural science), and Bayesian inference (including Markov chain Monte Carlo algorithms).

== Early life and education ==
Besag was born in Loughborough and was educated at Loughborough Grammar School. He began studying engineering at the University of Cambridge but moved to the University of Birmingham to study statistics, obtaining his BSc in 1968.

== Career ==
He then spent a year as a research assistant to Maurice Bartlett at the University of Oxford before obtaining a lectureship at the University of Liverpool. Inspired by John Tukey, he visited Princeton for a year.

He moved to the University of Durham in 1975, where he became a professor in 1986. He was a visiting professor at the University of Washington in Seattle during 1989–90 and, after a year at Newcastle University, returned to Seattle long-term. He officially retired in 2007 but remained an emeritus professor. At his death in 2010 he was also a visiting professor at the Universities of Bath and Bristol.

Besag was an ISI highly cited researcher; his 1986 paper "On the Statistical Analysis of Dirty Pictures" was the most cited paper by a UK mathematical scientist in the 1980s. The Royal Statistical Society awarded him its Guy Medal in Silver in 1983 for his contributions to spatial statistics, and he was elected a Fellow of the Royal Society in 2004.

== Notable contributions ==
=== Spatial statistics ===
For an array of random variables Y_{ij}, stochastic dependence was known to be important. Julian initially researched a model to for the correlation between Y_{ij} pairs as a function of the distance between the corresponding lattice point pairs. However, this proved to be difficult due to ambiguous conditions for self-consistency.

He therefore suggested using multivariate distributions for such a variable, taking inspiration from statistical physics and unpublished work by Peter Clifford and John Hammersley:

$P[Y_{i,j}|Y_{k,l}:(k,l)\neq(i,j)]$

He published his findings to the Royal Statistical Society in March 1974.

== Death ==
Besag died in Bristol, 2010 following a surgery.

== Notable publications ==
- Besag, J. (1974) "Spatial Interaction and the Statistical Analysis of Lattice Systems", Journal of the Royal Statistical Society, Series B, 36 (2), 192–236. JSTOR 2984812
- Besag, J. (1975) "Statistical Analysis of Non-Lattice Data." Journal of the Royal Statistical Society, Series D, 24(3), 179–195. JSTOR 2987782
- Besag, J. (1977) "Comments on Ripley's paper." Journal of the Royal Statistical Society, Series B, 39(2), 193–195
- Besag, J.E. (1986) "On the Statistical Analysis of Dirty Pictures," Journal of the Royal Statistical Society, Series B, 48, 259–302. JSTOR 2345426
- Besag, J.; York, J.; Mollié, A. (1991). "Bayesian image restoration, with two applications in spatial statistics". Annals of the Institute of Statistical Mathematics. 43 (1): 1–20. doi:10.1007/BF00116466. S2CID 13799826.

== See also ==
- Ripley's K and Besag's L function
- Spatial point process
