= Alfred William Flux =

British economist and statistician (1867–1942)

Sir Alfred William Flux CB
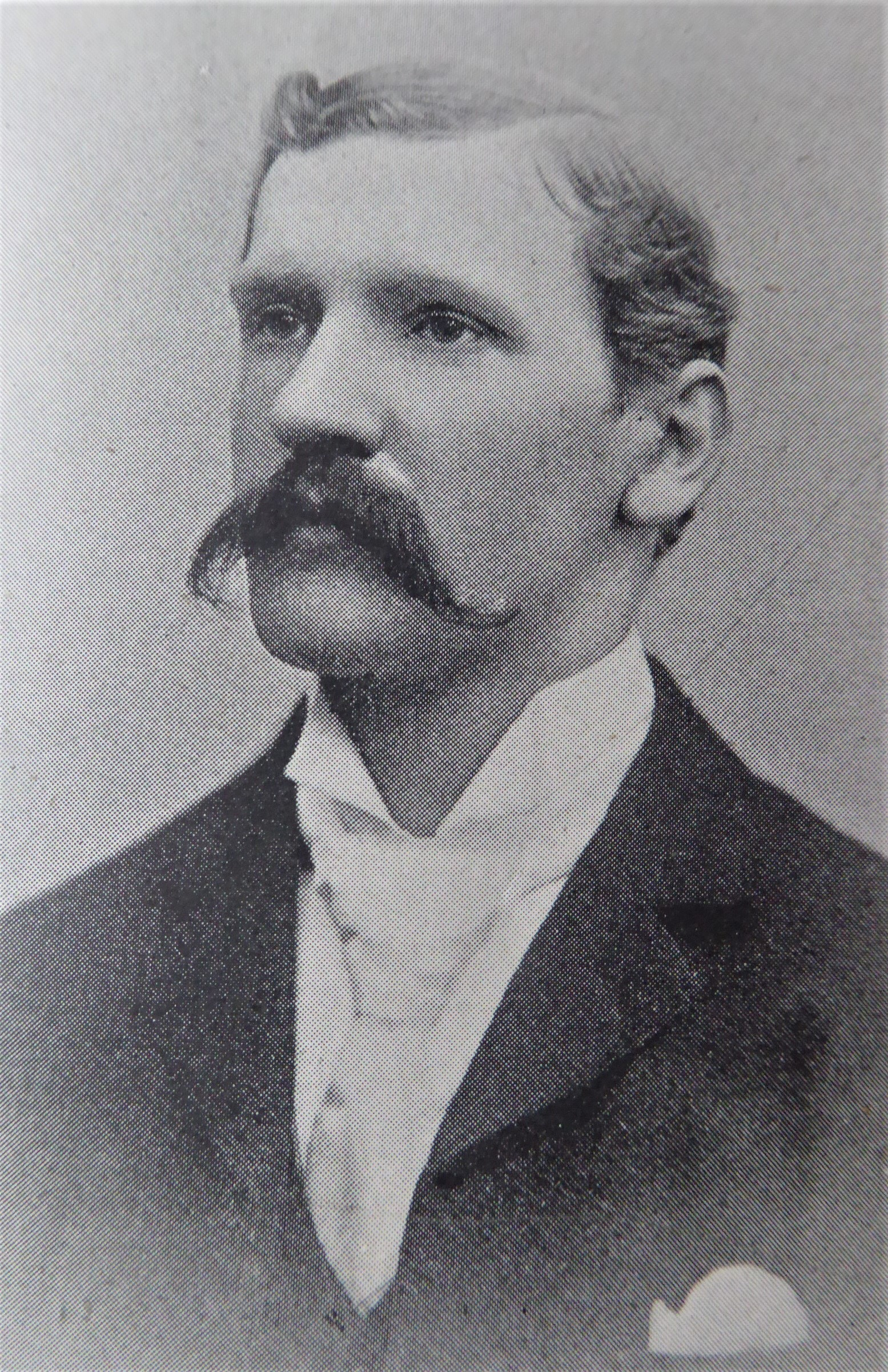
- Flux c. 1895
- Born: 8 April 1867; Portsmouth, Hampshire, UK
- Died: 16 July 1942 (aged 75); Faxe Ladeplads, Zealand, Denmark
- Education: St John's College, Cambridge
- Awards: Guy Medal (silver, 1921) (gold, 1930)
- Scientific career
- Fields: Economics, statistics
- Workplaces: Manchester University, McGill University

Sir Alfred William Flux, CB (8 April 1867 – 16 July 1942) was a British economist and statistician.

== Biography ==
Flux was born in the Landport district of Portsmouth in 1867, the son of a cement maker. He attended Portsmouth Grammar School then studied mathematics at St John's College, Cambridge, where he was a Senior Wrangler in 1887 (sharing the honour in a tie with three others). While at Cambridge he became friends with Alfred Marshall, who interested him in economics. He was a foundation member of the Economic Society (1890). In 1893 he was appointed as Cobden Lecturer in Political Economy at Owens College, Manchester and from then until 1908 taught economics, at Manchester and then at McGill University, Montreal. In 1897, while in Manchester he married Harriet Emily Hansen, a Danish woman. He served as secretary of the Manchester Literary and Philosophical Society in 1900–1901.

Flux returned to London in 1908 to take up a post as advisor to the Commercial, Labour and Statistics Department. In 1918, he was appointed Head of the Statistics Department of the Board of Trade. The Royal Statistical Society awarded him the Guy Medal in Silver in 1921 and in Gold in 1930. He also served as President of the Society between 1928 and 1930.

Flux retired to Denmark in 1932 and was knighted in 1934. He died of pneumonia in 1942, aged 75.

Professional and academic associations
Preceded by L. C. Casartelli	President of the Manchester Statistical Society; 1900–01	Succeeded by Sir William H. Houldsworth, Bt
Preceded by Francis Jones	Secretary of the Manchester Literary and Philosophical Society; 1900–01	Succeeded by Charles H. Lees
