= Henry Wynn =

British statistician (1945–2024)

- Born: Henry Philip Wynn; 19 February 1945; Barnsley, South Yorkshire, England
- Died: 2 November 2024 (aged 79)
- Education: University of Oxford; Imperial College London
- Known for: Optimal experimental design Computer experiments Risk modelling
- Awards: Guy Medal in Silver; George Box Medal
- Scientific career
- Fields: Statistics
- Workplaces: Imperial College London; City, University of London; University of Warwick; London School of Economics; Alan Turing Institute
- Doctoral advisor: David Cox

Henry Philip Wynn (19 February 1945 – 2 November 2024) was a British statistician. He was known for contributions to optimal experimental design, including the algorithm for constructing D-optimum experimental designs now known as the Wynn–Fedorov algorithm, and for work on the design and analysis of computer experiments. He held academic posts at Imperial College London, City, University of London, the University of Warwick and the London School of Economics (LSE), and served as President of the Royal Statistical Society (RSS) in 1977–78.

== Early life and education ==
Wynn was born in Barnsley, South Yorkshire, on 19 February 1945. His father, Arthur Wynn, was director of the Safety in Mines Research Establishment, and his mother, Margaret Wynn, was a writer on social policy.

After the family moved to London, Wynn was educated at Westminster School. He gained a BA in mathematics from St Catherine's College, Oxford, in 1967, and completed a PhD in mathematical statistics at Imperial College London. His doctoral supervisor at Imperial was David Cox.

== Career ==
After completing his PhD, Wynn worked for the Government Statistical Service from 1971 to 1972. He then returned to Imperial College London, where he was a lecturer and later reader in statistics.

In 1985 Wynn moved to City University London as Professor of Mathematical Statistics. He served as Dean of Mathematics from 1987 to 1995 and co-founded the Engineering Design Centre.

In 1995 he moved to the University of Warwick, where he was founding director of the Risk Initiative and Statistical Consultancy Unit. In 2003 he joined the London School of Economics as Professor of Statistics. He served as Head of the Department of Statistics from 2003 to 2006 and led the Decision Support and Risk Group. He was a full-time member of the LSE Department of Statistics from 2003 to 2011 and remained active there after retirement. He also held a part-time research post at the Alan Turing Institute.

From 2000 to 2005 Wynn was part-time Scientific Co-Director of EURANDOM, the international stochastics institute at Eindhoven University of Technology. In his later years he was principal investigator at LSE on the EU-funded CELSIUS and ReUseHeat projects, concerned with urban energy systems and heat recovery.

== Royal Statistical Society and professional service ==
Wynn served as President of the Royal Statistical Society in 1977–78. According to the RSS, he was the first, and as of 2024 the only, president of the society to be elected after a contested vote; he won the election by a 3:2 majority. He was also a founding president of the European Network for Business and Industrial Statistics (ENBIS).

== Research ==
Wynn's research covered both theoretical and applied statistics, with particular emphasis on experimental design, computer experiments, risk, reliability and statistical modelling.

His early work on D-optimum experimental design led to the sequential algorithm for constructing D-optimum designs, later known as the Wynn–Fedorov algorithm. In his 1970 paper "The Sequential Generation of D-Optimum Experimental Designs", Wynn described a method for approaching a D-optimum design by successively adding design points. His subsequent work further developed the theory and construction of D-optimum designs.

Wynn was also one of the authors of the influential 1989 paper "Design and Analysis of Computer Experiments", with Jerome Sacks, William J. Welch and Toby J. Mitchell. The paper proposed modelling deterministic computer-code output as a realisation of a stochastic process, providing a statistical basis for the design and analysis of expensive computer experiments.

Other areas of his work included dynamical search, algebraic statistics, maximum entropy sampling, uncertainty quantification and applications in engineering and risk analysis.

== Honours and awards ==
Wynn was awarded the Guy Medal in Silver by the Royal Statistical Society in 1982. He received the George Box Medal from ENBIS in 2011. He was an Honorary Fellow of the Institute of Actuaries and a Fellow of the Institute of Mathematical Statistics. He also held an Emeritus Fellowship from the Leverhulme Trust.

== Selected publications ==
- Wynn, Henry P. (1970). "The Sequential Generation of D-Optimum Experimental Designs". The Annals of Mathematical Statistics. 41 (5): 1655–1664. JSTOR 2239871.
- Wynn, Henry P. (1972). "Results in the Theory and Construction of D-Optimum Experimental Designs". Journal of the Royal Statistical Society: Series B (Methodological). 34 (2): 133–147. doi:10.1111/j.2517-6161.1972.tb00896.x.
- Sacks, Jerome; Welch, William J.; Mitchell, Toby J.; Wynn, Henry P. (1989). "Design and Analysis of Computer Experiments". Statistical Science. 4 (4): 409–423. doi:10.1214/ss/1177012413.
- Pronzato, Luc; Wynn, Henry P.; Zhigljavsky, Anatoly A. (2000). Dynamical Search: Applications of Dynamical Systems in Search and Optimization. Chapman & Hall/CRC. ISBN 9780849303364.
