= Jervoise Athelstane Baines =

British colonial administrator (1847–1925)

Sir Jervoise Athelstane Baines CSI FRGS (17 October 1847 – 26 November 1925) was an administrator in the Indian Civil Service during the period of the British Raj.

== Early life ==
Baines was the son of Edward Baines, the vicar of Yalding in Kent, and his wife, Catherine Eularia Baines. He was born on 17 October 1847 in the village of Bluntisham in the former English county of Huntingdonshire. He was educated at Rugby School and at Trinity College, Cambridge. In 1868, he passed the competitive examination for entry into the Indian Civil Service, spent two years in training and was then posted to the Bombay Presidency.

== India ==
Baines arrived in India in 1870, approximately halfway through the five-year-long attempt to collect statistical population data, which was the first such exercise by the Raj administration. In 1881, he was deputy superintendent of the census in the Presidency and excelled to the degree that he was appointed Census Commissioner for the national census of 1891. He had worked as an assistant collector and magistrate at Poona from 1883 and held various other posts while in India both in British India as well as in native states such as Travancore.

Baines spent much of his time organising the censuses and also analysing and producing reports based on their data, which were "widely recognised as the work of a brilliant ethnographer and statistician", according to an obituary published in Nature. For the 1891 census, Baines changed the classification from that which had been used in the exercise of 1881. His obituary in the Journal of the Royal Statistical Society describes the changes as being "first the separation of caste from religion and, secondly, the substitution of the population subsisting by an occupation for that exercising it." He wrote the resultant 300-page General Report. His work influenced that of his successors, such as H. H. Risley and Edward Gait, and his obituary in the Journal of the Royal Statistical Society noted that

he brought to the presentation and interpretation statistical of data not only all the resources of a well-stored mind but also a gift of sympathetic insight which enabled him to develop with almost dramatic vividness " the story behind the figures".

== Later life and recognition ==
In January 1894, Baines was made a Companion of the Order of the Star of India. He had worked on the decennial Report on Moral and Material Progress for 1891 and he was appointed as Secretary to the Royal Opium Commission for the period 1894–1895. He retired near to the end of 1895. Returning to England, he initially settled in London and became involved in local politics and administration, becoming an Alderman of London County Council between 1898 and 1902. He moved to Kidlington, Oxford in 1904, was knighted in 1905. and was a member of the Oxfordshire County Council from 1917 until 1922. Much of his involvement in Oxfordshire politics concerned education.

Baines was elected a fellow of the Royal Statistical Society in 1881 and served a term as its president between 1909 and 1910, following a continuous period as a member of the Society's Council from 1895. The society awarded him its Guy Medal in Gold in 1900, making him one of the eight people to receive the honour between its inception in 1892 and 1930. Baines was also a fellow of the Royal Geographical Society from 1896, an Honorary Member of the American Statistical Association and an elected member of the International Statistical Institute from 1897.

He died at Kidlington on 26 November 1925. He had married Constance Pyne in 1874, and the couple had a son and a daughter.

Baines was popular and well liked in the princely state of Travancore both for his services to the Maharajah, as well as his generosity to the ordinary citizens of Travancore. The erstwhile Baines residence in Trivandrum, the stately Lyndhurst house, is currently owned by the government of Kerala as a residence of one of the government ministers. The Baines family owned land at two locations in the leafy suburbs in Trivandrum city. Whilst they were leaving India, the Baines family parcelled and sold these pieces of land, at very affordable prices, to the local citizens. These two locations in Trivandrum (the Nanthancode Bains Compound in Nanthancode suburb, and the Museum Bains Compound between Nanthancode and Palayam, opposite to the present day Napier Zoological gardens/Trivandrum zoo) are named "Bains Compound" in his memory.

== Works ==
Among his written works are Ethnography (castes and tribes), which was published in 1912, contributions to the 1911 Encyclopædia Britannica (as J.A.B.), and numerous journal papers. The latter mostly concerned demographics, such as The Recent Trend of Population in England and Wales.

== See also ==
- Census of India prior to independence
