= John Aston (statistician) =

British statistician

Sir John Alexander David Aston
- Education: Bachelor's degree, University of Cambridge; PhD in statistics, Imperial College London and McGill University
- Occupations: Statistician, Academic
- Employers: University of Cambridge; University of Warwick; Academia Sinica
- Known for: Chief Scientific Adviser at the Home Office (2018–2020); Harding Professor of Statistics in Public Life; Non-executive director on the board of the UK Statistics Authority
- Title: Professor of Statistics, Statistical Laboratory, University of Cambridge; Non-executive director, UK Statistics Authority
- Spouse: Karri
- Children: 3
- Awards: Knighted in the 2021 Birthday Honours for services to statistics and public policymaking

Sir John Alexander David Aston FRS is a British statistician, Chief Scientific Adviser (CSA) at the Home Office (2018–2020), and Professor of Statistics, Statistical Laboratory, University of Cambridge. From 2021 he is the Harding Professor of Statistics in Public Life. And from July 2021 he has also served as a non-executive director on the board of the UK Statistics Authority.

Aston earned a bachelor's degree from the University of Cambridge, and a PhD in statistics from Imperial College London and McGill University in Montreal, Quebec. He was an academic at the University of Warwick and at Academia Sinica in Taiwan, before becoming a professor at the University of Cambridge.

Aston was one of the 23 attendees of the Scientific Advisory Group for Emergencies (Sage) during the early stage of the SARS-CoV2 pandemic owing to his CSA role at the time.

== Personal life ==
He and his wife, Karri, have three children.

== Honours ==
He was knighted in the 2021 Birthday Honours for services to statistics and public policymaking.
