= Geoffrey Heyworth, 1st Baron Heyworth =

British businessman

Geoffrey Heyworth, 1st Baron Heyworth (18 October 1894 – 15 June 1974), was a British businessman and public servant.

At the outbreak of World War I, he was employed as an accountant in Toronto, Canada. He served as a lieutenant in 134th Battalion, CEF 1916/1919. He was wounded in action in France on 14 July 1918.

Heyworth was chairman of Imperial Chemical Industries and of Unilever, a company for which he worked for 48 years until his retirement in 1960. He was also a member of the National Coal Board and the London Passenger Transport Board. In 1951, he was appointed to a commission, led by Sir Lionel Cohen, set up to look into the issue of taxation on income and profits. Having been knighted in 1948, he was raised to the peerage as Baron Heyworth on 25 July, 1955, of Oxton in the County Palatine of Chester, in recognition of his "... public services". He was the lead author of The Heyworth Report (1965), which led to the establishment of the Social Science Research Council. He was also President of the Royal Statistical Society from 1949 to 1950.

Lord Heyworth died in June 1974, aged 79. The barony died with him.

Peerage of the United Kingdom
| New creation | Baron Heyworth; 1955–1974 | Extinct |
