= T. M. F. Smith =

British statistician (1934–2019)

Terence Michael Frederick Smith (18 January 1934 – 7 December 2019) was a British statistician known for his research in survey sampling.

Fred Smith gained his first degree in 1959.

He succeeded Prof Maurice Quenouille as Professor of Statistics at the University of Southampton in 1975. He received the Guy Medal in bronze from the Royal Statistical Society in 1979. In 1983 he was elected as a Fellow of the American Statistical Association.

He was President of the Royal Statistical Society in 1991–1993.

== Selected bibliography ==
- Smith, T. M. F. (1984). "Present Position and Potential Developments: Some Personal Views: Sample surveys". Journal of the Royal Statistical Society, Series A. 147 (2): 208–221. doi:10.2307/2981677. JSTOR 2981677.
- Smith, T. M. F. (1993). "Populations and Selection: Limitations of Statistics (Presidential address)". Journal of the Royal Statistical Society, Series A. 156 (2): 144–166. doi:10.2307/2982726. JSTOR 2982726. (Portrait of T. M. F. Smith on page 144)
- Smith, T. M. F. (2001). "Biometrika centenary: Sample surveys". Biometrika. 88 (1): 167–243. doi:10.1093/biomet/88.1.167.
- Smith, T. M. F. (2001). "Biometrika centenary: Sample surveys". In D. M. Titterington and D. R. Cox (ed.). Biometrika: One Hundred Years. Oxford University Press. pp. 165–194. ISBN 0-19-850993-6.
- Smith, T. M. F.; Staetsky, L. (2007). "The teaching of statistics in UK universities". Journal of the Royal Statistical Society, Series A. 170 (3): 581–622. doi:10.1111/j.1467-985X.2007.00482.x. MR 2380589.
