= Philip Dawid =

British statistician (born 1946)

Philip Dawid FRS
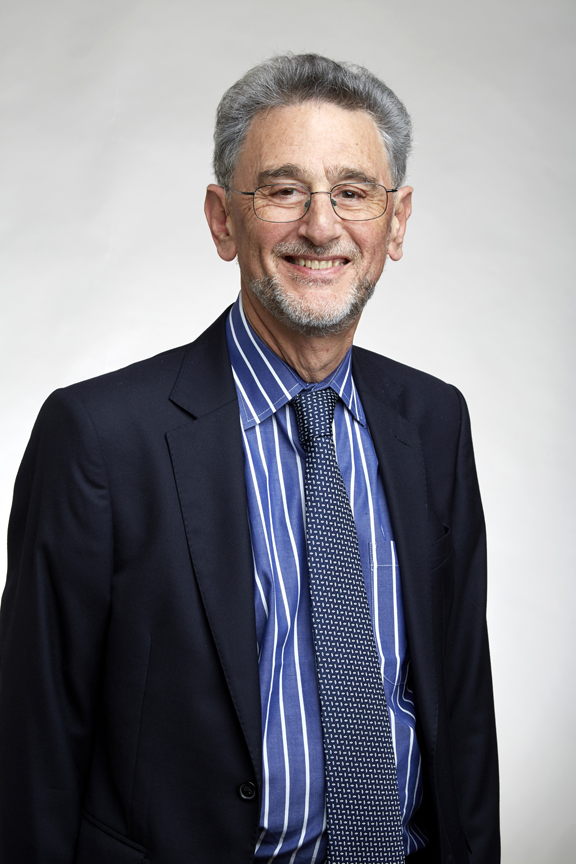
- Dawid in 2018
- Born: Alexander Philip Dawid; 1 February 1946 (age 80); Blackburn, Lancashire, England
- Citizenship: British
- Education: City of London School; University of Cambridge (BA, MA, ScD)
- Awards: Guy Medal (1978, 2001); Snedecor Award (1977); Fellow of the Royal Society (2018)
- Scientific career
- Fields: Statistics
- Workplaces: University College London; City University, London; Cambridge University
- Website: www.statslab.cam.ac.uk/~apd

Alexander Philip Dawid FRS (pronounced 'David'; born 1 February 1946) is Emeritus Professor of Statistics of the University of Cambridge, and a Fellow of Darwin College, Cambridge. He is a leading proponent of Bayesian statistics.

== Education ==
Dawid was educated at the City of London School, Trinity Hall, Cambridge and Darwin College, Cambridge.

== Career and research ==
Dawid has made fundamental contributions to both the philosophical underpinnings and the practical applications of statistics. His theory of conditional independence is a keystone of modern statistical theory and methods, and he has demonstrated its usefulness in a host of applications, including computation in probabilistic expert systems, causal inference, and forensic identification.

Dawid was lecturer in statistics at University College London from 1969 to 1978. He was subsequently Professor of Statistics at City University, London until 1981, when he returned to UCL as a reader, becoming Pearson Professor of Statistics there in 1982. He moved to the University of Cambridge where he was appointed Professor of Statistics in 2007, retiring in 2013.

=== Awards and honours ===
He was elected a member of the International Statistical Institute in 1978, and a Chartered Statistician of the Royal Statistical Society in 1993. He was editor of Biometrika from 1992 to 1996 and President of the International Society for Bayesian Analysis in 2000. He is also an elected Fellow of the Institute of Mathematical Statistics. and of the Royal Society. He received the 1977 George W. Snedecor Award from the Committee of Presidents of Statistical Societies. Dawid was awarded the 1978 Guy Medal in Bronze and the 2001 Guy Medal in Silver by the Royal Statistical Society.

His book Probabilistic Networks and Expert Systems, written jointly with Robert G. Cowell, Steffen Lauritzen, and David Spiegelhalter, received the 2001 DeGroot Prize from the International Society for Bayesian Analysis.
