= Bernard Benjamin =

British health statistician, actuary and demographer

- Born: 8 March 1910; London
- Died: 15 May 2002 (aged 92); London
- Citizenship: United Kingdom
- Education: Sir John Cass College
- Known for: Actuarial science, demography
- Awards: Gold Medal of the Institute of Actuaries (1975); Guy Medal (Gold, 1986)
- Scientific career
- Fields: Statistics
- Workplaces: London County Council; General Register Office; UK Ministry of Health; Greater London Council; City University

Bernard Benjamin (8 March 1910 – 15 May 2002) was a noted British health statistician, actuary and demographer. He was author or co-author of at least six books and over 100 papers in learned journals.

He was born in London and studied physics part-time at Sir John Cass College while working as an actuary for the London County Council pension fund, later moving to the public health section. Following wartime service as a statistician in the RAF he returned to the same civilian job and studied part-time for a PhD on the analysis of tuberculosis mortality. He was appointed Chief Statistician at the General Register Office in 1952, Director of Statistics at the Ministry of Health in 1963, then the first director of the Intelligence Unit of the Greater London Council in 1966. In 1973, he became professor of actuarial science at City University, the first chair in actuarial science at an English university, where he designed the first undergraduate degree program in the subject in the country.

He was secretary-general of the International Union for the Scientific Study of Population from 1962 to 1963. He was president of the Institute of Actuaries from 1966 to 1968 and of the Royal Statistical Society from 1970 to 1972, and was awarded the highest honours of both bodies – the Gold Medal (1975) and the Guy Medal in Gold (1986), respectively.
