= M. S. Bartlett =

English statistician (1910–2002)

- Born: 18 June 1910; London, England
- Died: 8 January 2002 (aged 91); Exmouth, Devon, England
- Education: University of Cambridge
- Awards: Guy Medal (Silver, 1952) (Gold, 1969); Weldon Memorial Prize (1971); Fellow of the Royal Society
- Scientific career
- Workplaces: University College, London; Imperial Chemical Industries; University of Cambridge; University of Manchester; University of Oxford
- Doctoral advisor: John Wishart
- Doctoral students: David George Kendall; Maurice Priestley; Alladi Ramakrishnan; Julian Besag

Maurice Stevenson Bartlett FRS (18 June 1910 – 8 January 2002) was an English statistician who made particular contributions to the analysis of data with spatial and temporal patterns. He is also known for his work in the theory of statistical inference and in multivariate analysis.

== Biography ==
Born in London, Bartlett was raised in a poor family but won a scholarship to Latymer Upper School in Hammersmith, where he was inspired to the study of statistics by a chapter in Hall and Knight's Algebra. In 1929, he won a scholarship to Queens' College, Cambridge where he read mathematics, graduating with the rank of wrangler. He attended lectures on statistics by John Wishart, on relativity by Arthur Eddington and on quantum mechanics by Paul Dirac. In one of his lectures Wishart described his geometric derivation of the Wishart distribution. Overnight Bartlett worked out a proof using characteristic functions. Bartlett was Wishart's first post-graduate student and they wrote two papers together. This was the beginning of Bartlett's involvement with multivariate analysis. During his Queens years, he rowed for the college.

In 1933, Bartlett was recruited by Egon Pearson to the new statistics department at University College, London. Pearson was already working with Jerzy Neyman. Also in the college were Ronald A. Fisher and J. B. S. Haldane. Bartlett was stimulated by all of them, most of all by the work of Fisher, criticising some of it (for example, fiducial inference) while developing other parts (for example conditional inference). Relations between the two men fluctuated; sometimes Bartlett was in Fisher's good books, but often not. In 1934, Bartlett became statistician at the Imperial Chemical Industries (ICI) agricultural research station at Jealott's Hill. Not only did he deal with practical problems but he worked on statistical theory, as well as on problems in genetics but he became interested in the characterisation of intelligence. He remembered Jealott's Hill as the best working environment of his career. Bartlett left ICI for the University of Cambridge in 1938 but at the outset of World War II was mobilised into the Ministry of Supply, conducting rocket research alongside Frank Anscombe, David Kendall and Pat Moran.

After the war Bartlett's renewed Cambridge work focused on time-series analysis and stochastic process. With Jo Moyal he planned a large book on probability, but the collaboration did not work out and Bartlett went ahead and published his own book on stochastic processes. He made a number of visits to the United States. In 1947 he became professor of mathematical statistics at the School of Mathematics at the University of Manchester where he not only developed his interests in epidemiology but also served as an able and active administrator. In 1960, he took up the chair of statistics at University College, London before serving the last eight years of his academic life as professor of biomathematics at the University of Oxford. He retired in 1975.

After his retirement Bartlett remained active in statistics, visiting the Institute of Advanced Studies at the Australian National University several times. He had married Sheila, daughter of C. E. Chapman, in 1957, the couple parenting a daughter. Bartlett died in Exmouth, Devon.

Bartlett is known for Bartlett's method for estimating power spectra and Bartlett's test for homoscedasticity.

== Honours ==
- Rayleigh Prize, (1933);
- Guy Medals in Silver (1952) and Gold (1969) of the Royal Statistical Society;
- President of the Manchester Statistical Society, (1959–1960);
- Fellow of the Royal Society, (1961);
- President of the Royal Statistical Society (1966);
- Honorary Member of the International Statistical Institute, (1980);
- Foreign Associate of the U.S. National Academy of Sciences, (1993);
- D.Sc.s from the University of Chicago (1966) and the University of Hull (1976).

== Works ==
=== Books ===
- An Introduction to Stochastic Processes, (1955) ISBN 0-521-04116-3
  - Darling, Donald A. (1956). "Review of An introduction to stochastic processes with special reference to methods and applications by M. S. Bartlett". Bull. Amer. Math. Soc. 62: 73–74. doi:10.1090/S0002-9904-1956-09989-6.
- Stochastic Population Models in Ecology and Epidemiology, (1960) ISBN 0-416-52330-7
- Essays in Probability and Statistics, (1962) ISBN 0-416-64880-0
- Probability, Statistics and Time, (1975) ISBN 0-412-14150-7
- The Statistical Analysis of Spatial Pattern, (1976) ISBN 0-412-14290-2
- Selected Papers of M. S. Bartlett 3 vols. edited by R.G. Stanton, E.D. Johnson, D.S. Meek. Winnipeg : Charles Babbage Research Centre (1989).

=== Selected papers ===
- (1933) with John Wishart, The distribution of second order moment statistics in a normal system. Proc. Camb. Philos. Soc. 28, 455–459.
- (1933) On the theory of statistical regression. Proc. Royal Soc. Edinburgh, 53, 260–283.
- (1933) Probability and chance in the theory of statistics. Proc. Royal Soc. Lond. A 141 518–534.
- (1934) The vector representation of a sample. Proc. Camb. Philos. Soc., 30, 327–340.
- (1936) Statistical information and properties of sufficiency. Proc. Royal Soc. Lond. A 154, 124–137.
- (1937) Properties of sufficiency and statistical tests. Proc. Royal Soc. Lond. A, 160, 268–282. (reprinted with an introduction by D. A. S. Fraser S. Kotz & N. L. Johnson (eds) Breakthroughs in Statistics, volume 1. Springer, New York. 1992.)
- (1938) Methods of estimating mental factors. Nature, 141, 609–610.
- (1939) A note on tests of significance in multivariate analysis, in Proceedings of the Cambridge Philosophical Society
- (1941) The statistical significance of canonical correlation. Biometrika.
- (1947) The use of transformations. Biometrics.
- (1948) Internal and external factor analysis. British Journal of Psychiatry.
- (1949) Fitting a straight line when both variables are subjects to error. Biometrics.
- (1949) The statistical significance of "dispersed hits" in card-guessing experiments. Proceedings of the Society for Psychical Research, 48, 336–338.
- (1950) Tests of significance in multivariate analysis. British Journal of Mathematical and Statistical Psychology.
- (1950) Tests of significance in factor analysis. British Journal of Psychology, 3, 77–85.

== Autobiography ==
- Ingram Olkin (1989) A Conversation with Maurice Bartlett, Statistical Science, 4, 151–163.
- "Chance and Change" in J. Gani (ed) (1982) The Making of Statisticians, New York: Springer-Verlag.

Several statisticians, including Bartlett, give their life stories.

Professional and academic associations
Preceded by E. Devons	President of the Manchester Statistical Society; 1959–60	Succeeded by L. H. C. Tippett
