= Jinchi Lv =

Statistician and data scientist

Jinchi Lv is a statistician, data scientist, a chaired professor in the Data Sciences and Operations department of the Marshall School of Business, and professor of mathematics at the University of Southern California. He is a co-developer of several data science learning, inference methods and algorithms for feature screening, model selection with misspecification, large Gaussian graphical models, and feature selection with controlled error rates such as the sure independence screening (SIS), the generalized Bayesian information criterion with prior probability (GBICp), the innovated scalable efficient estimation (ISEE), and the model-X knockoffs (MXK). He is an elected fellow of the American Statistical Association, the Institute of Mathematical Statistics, and the Asia-Pacific Artificial Intelligence Association, and the recipient of the Royal Statistical Society's Guy Medal in Bronze.

He chairs the Data Sciences and Operations (DSO) department at USC Marshall. Also, he has served on several university-level academic committees such as the USC UCAPT committee (university committee on appointments, promotions, and tenure), the USC deadlines and leaves committee, and the USC research committee.
