= Sylvia Richardson =

French/British Bayesian statistician

Sylvia Richardson CBE FMedSci
- Known for: Transdimensional MCMC
- Awards: Guy Medal (Silver, 2009)
- Scientific career
- Workplaces: University of Warwick, University of Paris V, INSERM, Imperial College, London, University of Cambridge, Medical Research Council
- Thesis: Some Ergodic Properties of Stopping Time Transformations. (1978)

Sylvia Therese Richardson is a French/British Bayesian statistician and is currently Professor of Biostatistics and Director of the MRC Biostatistics Unit at the University of Cambridge. In 2021 she became the president of the Royal Statistical Society for the 2021–22 year.

== Education ==
Richardson completed her PhD at the University of Nottingham in 1978 with a thesis entitled "Ergodic properties of stopping time transformations”. She then went to study at Université Paris-Sud supervised by Jean Bretagnolle was awarded a Doctorat d'État for a thesis entitled "Processus spatialement dépendants: convergence vers la normalité, tests d'association et applications" in 1989.

== Career ==
Richardson has been the MRC Research Professor of Biostatistics at the University of Cambridge, bye-fellow of Emmanuel College and Director of the Medical Research Council Biostatistics Unit since 2012. Previously, she was chair in Biostatistics at Imperial College London from 2000 and before that she was Directeur de Recherches at INSERM and held lectureships at Warwick University and the University of Paris V.

She is co-editor of the volume Markov Chain Monte Carlo in Practice with Wally Gilks and David Spiegelhalter.

== Research ==
Richardson has made significant contributions to Bayesian statistical methodology and the application of Markov chain Monte Carlo. Her expertise is in spatial statistics with applications to geographic epidemiology and in biostatistics with applications in biochemical modeling, in particular modeling of gene expression data.

== Recognition ==
Richardson was awarded the Guy Medal of The Royal Statistical Society in Silver in 2009. She is also a Fellow of the Institute of Mathematical Statistics, of the International Society for Bayesian Analysis and of the Academy of Medical Sciences.

She was appointed Commander of the Order of the British Empire (CBE) in the 2019 Birthday Honours for services to medical statistics.

She was awarded the Zellner medal by the International Society for Bayesian Analysis (ISBA) in 2026.
