= Greenwood statistic =

Concept in spatial data analysis

The Greenwood statistic is a spacing statistic and can be used to evaluate clustering of events in time or locations in space.

== Definition ==
In general, for a given sequence of events in time or space the statistic is given by:.

$$G(n)=\sum^{n+1}_{i=1}D^2_i ,$$

where $D_i$ represents the interval between events or points in space and is a number between 0 and 1 such that the sum of all $D_i = 1$.

Where intervals are given by numbers that do not represent a fraction of the time period or distance, the Greenwood statistic is modified and is given by:

$$G(n)=\frac{\sum^{n+1}_{i=1}X^2_i}{T_n^2} ,$$

where:

$$T_n=\sum^{n+1}_{i=1}X_i,$$

and $X_i$ represents the length of the 'ith interval, which is either the time between events or the distances between points in space.

A reformulation of the statistic yields

$$G(n)=\tfrac{1}{n+1} (\tfrac{n}{n+1}C_v^2+1) ,$$

where $C_v$ is the sample coefficient of variation of the n + 1 interval lengths.

== Properties ==
The Greenwood statistic is a comparative measure that has a range of values between 0 and 1. For example, applying the Greenwood statistic to the arrival of 11 buses in a given time period of say 1 hour, where in the first example all eleven buses arrived at a given point each 6 minutes apart, would give a result of roughly 0.10. However, in the second example if the buses became bunched up or clustered so that 6 buses arrived 10 minutes apart and then 5 buses arrived 2 minutes apart in the last 10 minutes, the result is roughly 0.17. The result for a random distribution of 11 bus arrival times in an hour will fall somewhere between 0.10 and 0.17. So this can be used to tell how well a bus system is running and in a similar way, the Greenwood statistic was also used to determine how and where genes are placed in the chromosomes of living organisms. This research showed that there is a definite order to where genes are placed, particularly with regard to what function the genes perform, and this is important in the science of genetics.
