= Patrick Craigie =

British statistician (1843–1930)

Patrick George Craigie CB (29 May 1843 – 10 January 1930) was a British agricultural statistician. He was born in Perth and educated at Edinburgh and Cambridge Universities. Craigie headed the Statistical, Intelligence, and Educational Branch of the Board of Agriculture from 1890 until his retirement in 1906 and was prominent in the Royal Statistical Society, serving as its President from 1902 to 1904.

In 1908, he was awarded the Society's highest honour, the Guy Medal in Gold, recognising his "extraordinary services to statistical science in connection with the development of agricultural statistics." From 1861 to 1882 Craigie served in the Royal Perth Militia: his military rank served as a title and so in later years he was generally referred to as Major Craigie.
