= Edward Brabrook =

British barrister and anthropologist (1839–1930)

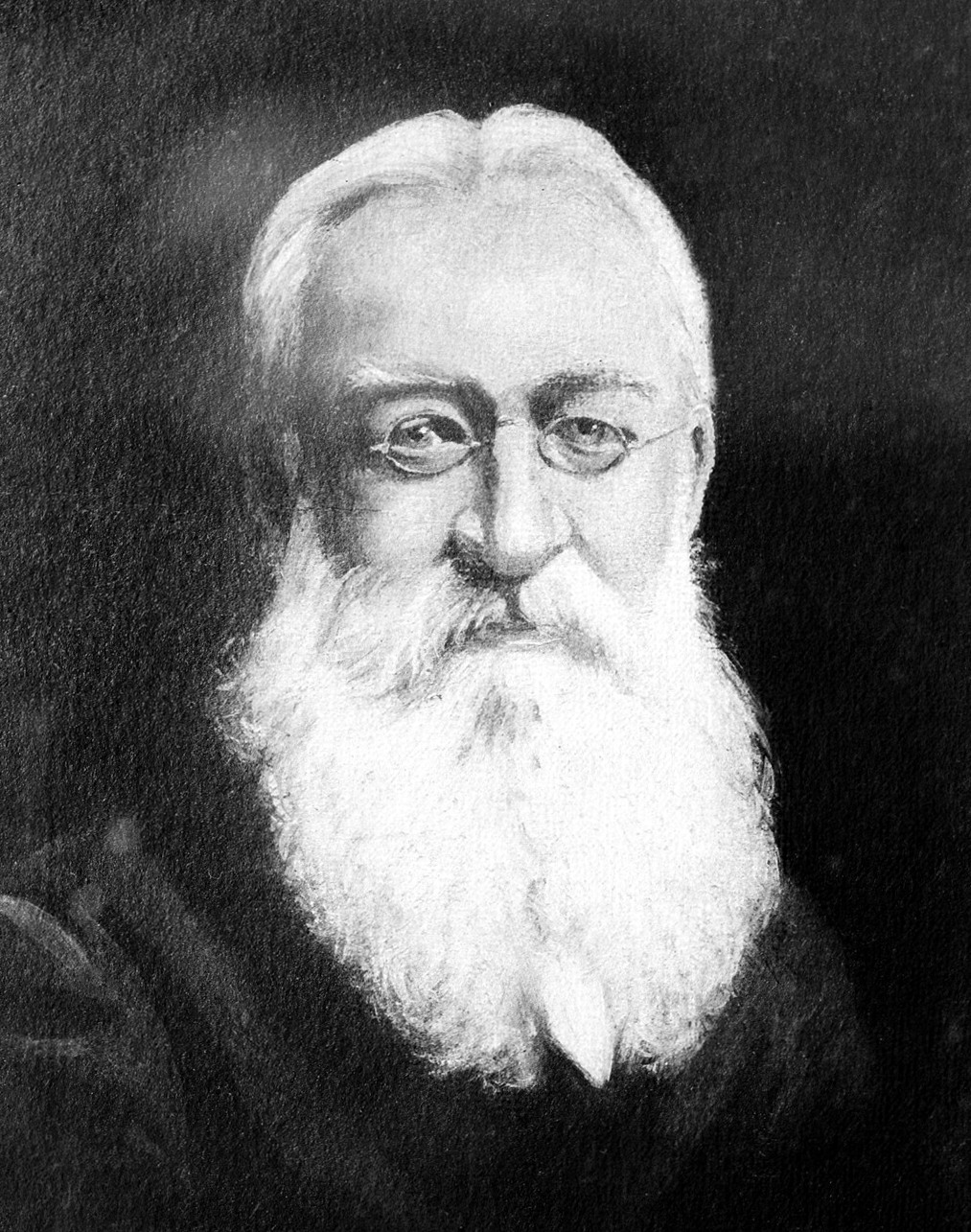
- Born: 1839
- Died: 1930 (aged 90–91)

Sir Edward William Brabrook CB FSA FRAI (10 April 1839 – 20 March 1930) was an English civil servant, author, and anthropologist with a special interest in folklore. He was a member of the Folklore Society and a fellow of Society of Antiquaries of London and was awarded the silver Guy Medal in 1909.

Born in 1839 in London, Brabrook was a lawyer by training and became the senior registrar of friendly societies. He wrote extensively on the law relating to working-class self-help institutions, promoting legal guides for industrial and provident (co-operative) societies, trade unions, and savings banks. He was appointed a Companion of the Order of the Bath in the 1897 Diamond Jubilee Honours.

His works included a proposal for an "Ethnographic Survey of the United Kingdom" put to the British Association for the Advancement of Science, coordinating activities of the Folklore Society, Anthropological Institute and Society of Antiquaries. He was president of the Anthropological Institute in 1895–1897; and president of the London and Middlesex Archaeological Society from 1910 to 1930.

Baptised at Wesley's Chapel, City Road, London on 12 May 1839. He died in 1930 in Wallington, Surrey and was buried at West Norwood Cemetery.

Marriages

His first wife was Emily Caroline Withers (1840-1864) who died in childbirth. His second wife was Eliza Emma Withers (1843-1900). He married his third wife third wife Flora Maud Withers (1854-1922) at Brighton in 1914.

Thus he married two of his deceased wife’s sisters.

Children

By his first wife he had Edward Frederick (1862-1898) and Emily Caroline (1863-1902). By his second wife he had two sons: Ernest George (1867-1935), Henry Robert (1870-1941), and eight daughters: Eliza Margaret (1866-1927), Grace Edith (1869-1895), Alice Georgina (1872-1941), Isabel Mary (1874-1945), Flora Catherine (1878-1935), Constance Minnie (1881-1944), Winifred Ellen (1881-1961), and Beatrice Audrey (1885-1895).

Thus, he was predeceased by four of his children.

The Great War

On 3 May 1918 his grandson, Edward John Brabrook, 2nd Lieutenant, the only son of Edward Frederick Brabrook, was reported killed in action on Easter Monday.

Tragedy at St Leonards on Sea

Two of his daughters, Grace Edith and Beatrice Audrey, were drowned in while bathing at St Leonards on Sea, Sussex, on 31 August 1895. They were staying at the Wilton House Home of Rest and had gone out to swim at seven o’clock dressed in bathing costumes and mackintoshes. Not being seen for some time, a search was started, and their bodies were discovered opposite the Grand Parade.

The two girls were buried at the South Metropolitan Cemetery (now West Norwood Cemetery), one of the ‘Victorian Seven’. Their parents had the following dedications inscribed on the monument. Of Grace Edith: ‘Gifted with rare talent, a strong character and a deeply loving heart’. Of Beatrice Audrey: ‘A sweet gracious and happy child’. Grace Edith was a member of the Incorporated Society of Professional Musicians and an assistant pianist at Trinity College.

Residence

At the time of his two daughters’ death and in 1901 Sir Edward was living with this family at 178 Bedford Hill Road, Balham, London, SW12. The detached property is double-fronted and, as described in the Census returns, had 12 rooms, excluding kitchen, scullery and closet.

This area of Balham between the Balham and Croydon branch of the London, Brighton, and South Coast Railway, Tooting Bec Road and Balham (now High) Road was developed with roads and housing from 1872, with construction still ongoing in 1894. For example, the first newspaper references to Fontenoy Road being in 1875 and to Childebert Road in 1891 when new lamps were to be erected.

Alfred Heaver, the property developer, began developing the area east of Bedford Hill Road in 1888 with properties in the Queen Anne Revival style. Subsequently, Heaver advertised ‘superior houses’ in Streathbourne Road in 1894 for a purchase price of £550 or for a yearly rent of £50, operating from his house at Homeland, Benningfield Road, Battersea Rise.

Similar properties to No.178 in Bedford Hill Road display panels of red brick on their facades with floral or classical motifs. However, it is noteworthy that No.178 has instead a face of the Green Man, a significant figure in English folklore. Given Sir Edward’s interest in folklore, it may be conjectured that he had this design specially commissioned for the property.

== Bibliography ==
- Brabrook, E.W. (1897). "Man in Zoology". The Zoologist. 4th series, vol 1 (issue 667, January): 13–21.
- —— (1898). Provident Societies and Industrial Welfare. London: Blackie & Son.
- —— (January 1910). "Eugenics and pauperism". The Eugenics Review. 1 (4): 229–241. PMC 2986698. PMID 21259477.
