= Peter Armitage (statistician) =

British statistician (1924–2024)

Peter Armitage CBE
- Born: 15 June 1924; Huddersfield, England
- Died: 14 February 2024 (aged 99)
- Education: University of Cambridge
- Known for: Cochran–Armitage test for trend
- Awards: Guy Medal (bronze, 1962) (silver, 1978) (gold, 1990)
- Scientific career
- Fields: Statistics
- Workplaces: London School of Hygiene and Tropical Medicine

Peter Armitage CBE (15 June 1924 – 14 February 2024) was a British statistician who specialised in medical statistics.

== Life and career ==
Peter Armitage was born in Huddersfield, and was educated at Huddersfield College, before going on to read mathematics at Trinity College, Cambridge. Armitage belonged to the generation of mathematicians who came to maturity in the Second World War. He joined the weapons procurement agency, the Ministry of Supply where he worked on statistical problems with George Barnard.

After the war he resumed his studies and then worked as a statistician for the Medical Research Council from 1947 to 1961. From 1961 to 1976, he was Professor of Medical Statistics at the London School of Hygiene and Tropical Medicine where he succeeded Austin Bradford Hill. His main work there was on sequential analysis. He moved to Oxford as Professor of Biomathematics and became Professor of Applied Statistics and head of the new Department of Statistics, retiring in 1990. He was president of the Royal Statistical Society in 1982–4. He was president of the International Society for Clinical Biostatistics in 1990–1991, and editor-in-chief of the Encyclopedia of Biostatistics.

Armitage lived in Wallingford, Oxfordshire, and died on 14 February 2024, at the age of 99.
