= D. J. Bartholomew =

British statistician

D. J. Bartholomew FBA
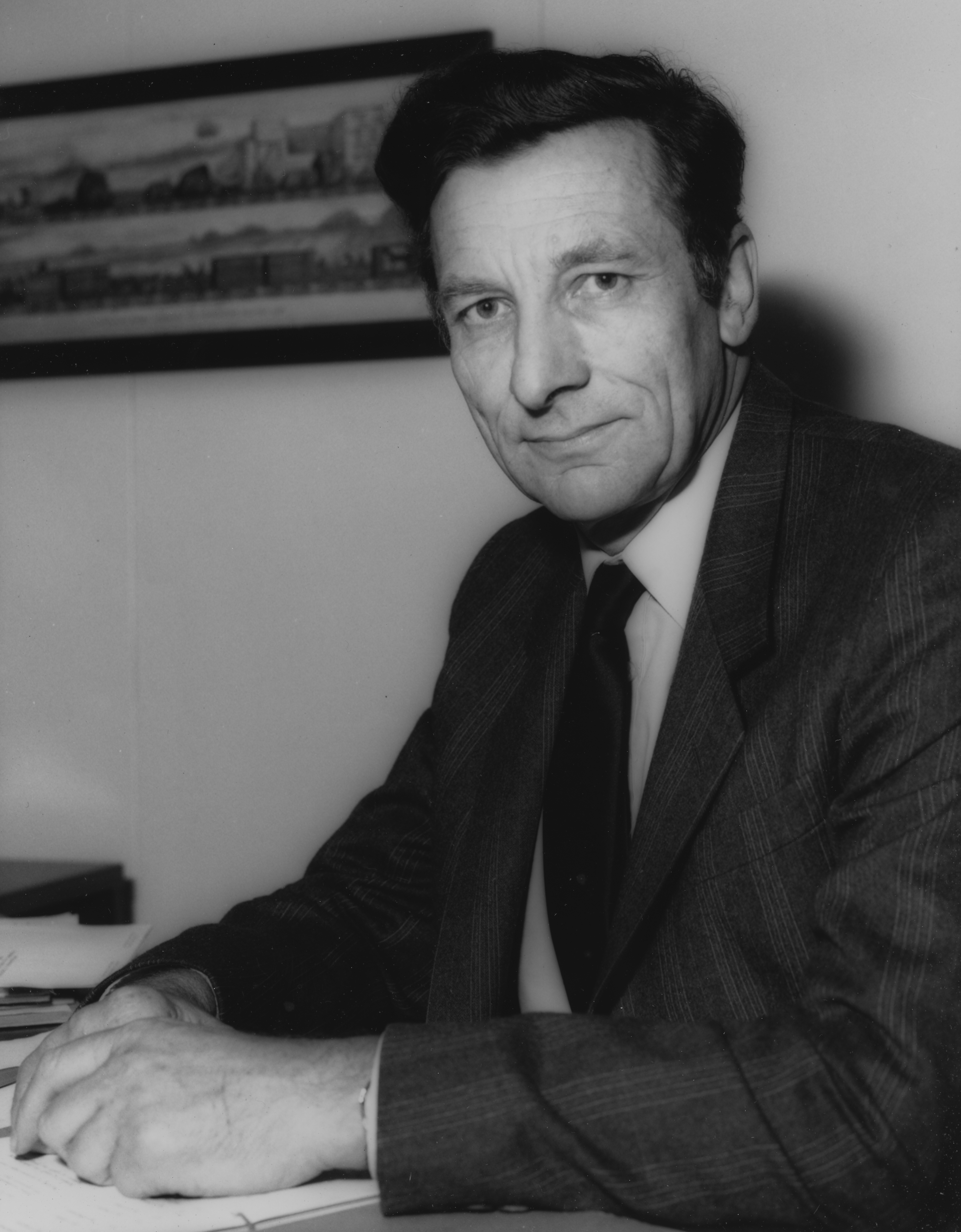
- Born: 6 August 1931; Oakley, Bedfordshire
- Died: 16 October 2017 (aged 86)
- Occupations: Statistician, writer

David John Bartholomew FBA (6 August 1931 – 16 October 2017) was a British statistician who was president of the Royal Statistical Society between 1993 and 1995. He was professor of statistics at the London School of Economics between 1973 and 1996.

== Career ==
Bartholomew was born 6 August 1931, the son of Albert and Joyce Bartholomew in Oakley, Bedfordshire. He was educated at Bedford Modern School and University College London, where he earned his BSc and PhD.

Bartholomew began his career as a scientist at the National Coal Board in 1955. In 1957 he became a lecturer in statistics at the University of Keele, before his appointment as a senior lecturer at the University College of Wales, Aberystwyth.

Bartholomew was appointed professor of statistics at the University of Kent in 1967 before being made professor of statistics at the London School of Economics in 1973, a position he held until 1996. He was emeritus professor (pro-director) between 1988 and 1991.

Bartholomew was president of the Royal Statistical Society, 1993–95 (honorary secretary, 1976–82; treasurer, 1989–93). He was vice-president of the Manpower Society (1987–95) and was chairman of the Science and Religion Forum between 1997 and 2000.

In 1955, Bartholomew married Marian Elsie Lake, and they have two daughters. Bartholomew was elected a Fellow of the British Academy in 1987.

== Religious views ==
Bartholomew authored several books defending the existence of the Christian God from a Biblical and statistical basis, God of Chance (1984), Uncertain Belief: Is It Rational to Be a Christian? (1996) and God, Chance and Purpose (2008).

In his 1984 book God of Chance, Bartholomew argued that the universe is "designed in such a way that chance had a role to play... Chance was God's idea and... he uses it to ensure the variety, resilience and freedom necessary to achieve his purposes." Similarly, his 2008 book God, Chance and Purpose argues that chance is part of the means by which God governs the world.

Bartholomew debated atheist physicist Victor Stenger on whether or not God is a failed hypothesis.

== Books ==
- 1961: & S.E. Finer and H.B. Berrington Backbench Opinion in the House of Commons, 1955–1959. Oxford: Pergamon Press.
- 1967: Stochastic Models for Social Processes, New York and London: John Wiley and Sons. (German translation 1970).
- 1971: & E.E. Bassett, Let's Look at the Figures: the quantitative approach to human affairs), Harmondsworth Middlesex: Penguin books (Dutch translation, 1971).
- 1971: & B.R.Morris (eds.), Aspects of Manpower Planning, London: English Universities Press.
- 1971: & A.R.Smith (eds.) Manpower and Management Science, London: English Universities Press.
- 1972: & R.E. Barlow, H.D. Brunk and J.M. Bremner, Statistical Inference under Order Restrictions, Chichester: John Wiley and Sons.
- 1973: Stochastic Models for Social Processes, (revised and enlarged) Chichester 2nd edition: John Wiley and Sons.
- 1976: (ed.) Manpower Planning, Harmondsworth, Middlesex: Penguin Books.
- 1979: & A.F.Forbes, Statistical Techniques for Manpower Planning, Chichester: John Wiley and Sons.
- 1981: Mathematical Methods in Social Science, Chichester: John Wiley and Sons.
- 1982: Stochastic Models for Social Processes, Chichester 3rd edition: John Wiley and Sons.
- 1985: Russian translation of Chapters 1–8 of Stochastic Models for Social Processes, 3rd edition, Moscow.
- 1984: God of Chance, London: SCM Press, Italian translation, 1987.
- 1987: Latent Variable Models and Factor Analysis, London: Griffin.
- 1991: & A. F. Forbes and S.I. McClean, Statistical Techniques for Manpower Planning, Chichester 2nd edition: John Wiley and Sons (Hebrew translation 2001, The Open University of Israel).
- 1993: & K.Haagen & M.Deistler (eds.), Statistical Modelling and Latent Variables, Amsterdam: North-Holland.
- 1996: Uncertain Belief, Oxford: The Clarendon Press.
- 1996: The Statistical Approach to Social Measurement, San Diego: Academic Press.
- 1999: & M. Knott, Latent Variable Models and Factor Analysis, London Arnold, 2nd edition:
- 2002: & F. Steele, I Moustaki & J. I. Galbraith, The Analysis and Interpretation of Multivariate Data for Social Scientists, Boca Raton, Florida: Chapman & Hall/CRC.
- 2004: Measuring Intelligence: Facts and Fallacies, Cambridge: Cambridge University Press.
- 2006: (Ed) Measurement. Benchmarks in Social Research Methods, (4 Vols.) Thousand Oaks, Ca: Sage Publications.
- 2008: & F Steele, I Moustaki, J Galbraith, Analysis of Multivariate Social Science Data, (second edition) Boca Raton, Florida: Chapman & Hall/CRC
- 2008: God, Chance and Purpose: Can God have it both ways? Cambridge: Cambridge University Press.
- 2011: & M Knott, I Moustaki, Latent Variable Models and factor Analysis: A unified approach. Chichester: John Wiley and Sons Ltd
- 2013: Unobserved Variables: Models and Misunderstandings. Heidelberg: Springer
