= Peter G. Moore =

British statistician

Professor Peter Gerald Moore TD FIA (5 April 1928 – 14 June 2010) was a British academic, actuary, and statistician. He was Professor of Statistics at London Business School, 1965–1993 and its principal from 1984 to 1989.

Moore was a graduate of KCS Wimbledon, and subsequently at University College London where he took a first class honors degree in statistics. He also completed a PhD at UCL, including time spent studying at Princeton, NJ (US) as a Commonwealth Fund Harkness Fellow. Following National Service with the Royal Horse Artillery where he rose to the rank of Major, he joined the Territorial Army and was awarded the Territorial Decoration in 1963.

He was a partner in consulting actuaries Duncan Fraser from 1974 to 1977. In 1984 he became the first president of the Institute of Actuaries from outside the insurance industry (1984-1986), subsequently also becoming the President of the Royal Statistical Society (1989-1991). A freeman of the city of London, he served as master of the Tallow Chandlers Company from 1994 to 1995. He was awarded the Guy medal (1970) and the Chambers Medal (1995) He served as a director of many FTSE 100 companies, government committees and helped establish the Hong Kong University of Science and Technology. He was a prolific writer, publishing many books on statistics and risk in management decisions. His books include: Standard Statistical Calculations 1965, Basic Operational Research 1971, Reason By Numbers 1980, The Anatomy of Decisions 1989,

Moore received an honorary doctorate from Heriot-Watt University in 1985

His primary career legacy remains the London Business School. As a founding member of the faculty, he helped shape the curriculum and build the institution into a world leading provider of management education. In his roles as Vice Principal and Principal (now Dean) through the 1970s and 1980s, he grew the organisation, programs, student base and facilities.
