= Irini Moustaki =

Greek statistician

Irini Moustaki is a Greek statistician who works in the UK at the London School of Economics, as Professor in Social Statistics, in the Department of Statistics. She lists her research interests as "latent variable models, categorical data, missing values, multivariate analysis, data analysis, detection of outliers, longitudinal data, composite likelihood, large-scale educational assessment, and psychometrics".

== Education and career ==
Moustaki received a bachelor's degree in statistics and computer science in 1989, from the Athens University of Economics and Business. She came to the London School of Economics (LSE) as a graduate student in statistics; there, she received a master's degree in 1991 and completed her Ph.D. in 1996. Her doctoral dissertation, Latent variable models for mixed manifest variables, was supervised by Colm O'Muircheartaigh.

In her final year as a doctoral student, she worked as a temporary lecturer at LSE, and after completing her doctorate she continued there as a lecturer until 2002. From 2002 to 2009 she returned to the Athens University of Economics and Business as an assistant professor and (after 2005) associate professor. Meanwhile, beginning in 2007 she held a second affiliation as reader in statistics at LSE. From 2010 until 2012 she served as head of the LSE statistics department. She has been a full professor at LSE since 2013.

She was executive editor of the journal Psychometrika from 2014 to 2018, and served as president of the Psychometric Society from 2021 to 2022.

== Books ==
Moustaki is the coauthor of books including:

- Analysis of Multivariate Social Science Data (2002, 2008 & 2026), and
- Latent Variable Models and Factor Analysis: A Unified Approach (2011).

Her edited volumes include Latent Variable and Latent Structure Models (2002).

== Recognition ==
The University of Uppsala gave Moustaki an honorary doctorate in 2014. The Education University of Hong Kong named Moustaki as an honorary professor in the Department of Psychological Studies from 2015 to 2018.

She was named as a Fellow of the British Academy (FBA) in 2025.
