= Peter Green (statistician) =

British statistician

Peter James Green
- Born: 28 April 1950 (age 76); Solihull, England
- Education: University of Oxford; University of Sheffield
- Known for: Reversible-jump Markov chain Monte Carlo
- Awards: Guy Medal (Bronze, 1987; Silver, 1999)
- Scientific career
- Workplaces: University of Bath; University of Bristol; University of Durham; University of Wisconsin–Madison; University of Technology, Sydney
- Doctoral advisor: Douglas P. Kennedy
- Website: petergreen5678.github.io

Peter James Green, FRS (born 28 April 1950) is a British Bayesian statistician. He is emeritus Professor of Statistics at the University of Bristol. Until 2024, he was a Professorial Research Fellow at Bristol, and until 2022 a distinguished professor at the University of Technology, Sydney. He is distinguished for his contributions to computational statistics, in particular his contributions to spatial statistics and semi-parametric regression models and also his development of reversible-jump Markov chain Monte Carlo.

== Education and career ==
Green was born in Solihull and attended Solihull School. He studied mathematics at Oxford University before moving to the University of Sheffield for postgraduate study, where he was awarded an MSc in probability and statistics and a PhD in applied probability.

In 2024, Green had publicly questioned the usefulness of specific evidence in relation to the case of Lucy Letby, who was convicted of the murder of a number of babies in her care, namely the staff rotas and blood samples from babies who had collapsed with low blood sugar. However lawyers for the affected families declared during the subsequent hospital inquiry into the neonatal deaths that he and others questioning the conviction "should be ashamed of themselves".

== Honors and awards ==
Green was elected a Fellow of the Royal Society in 2003. He served as president of the Royal Statistical Society from 2001 to 2003, having previously been awarded its Guy Medal in both Bronze (1987) and Silver (1999). He held a Royal Society Wolfson Research Merit Award from 2006 to 2011. He was president of the International Society for Bayesian Analysis for the year 2007.

He is currently Chair of the Trustees of the journal Biometrika, and was editor of the journal Statistical Science for 2014–2016.
