= Hector Leak =

British statistician (1887–1976)

Hector Leak CBE (23 July 1887 – 5 April 1976) was a British statistician. He was appointed a CBE in 1942. He was also the president of the Royal Statistical Society during a short period in 1941. Awarded the silver Guy Medal in 1940.
