= Austin Bradford Hill =

English epidemiologist and statistician (1897–1991)

Sir Austin Bradford Hill
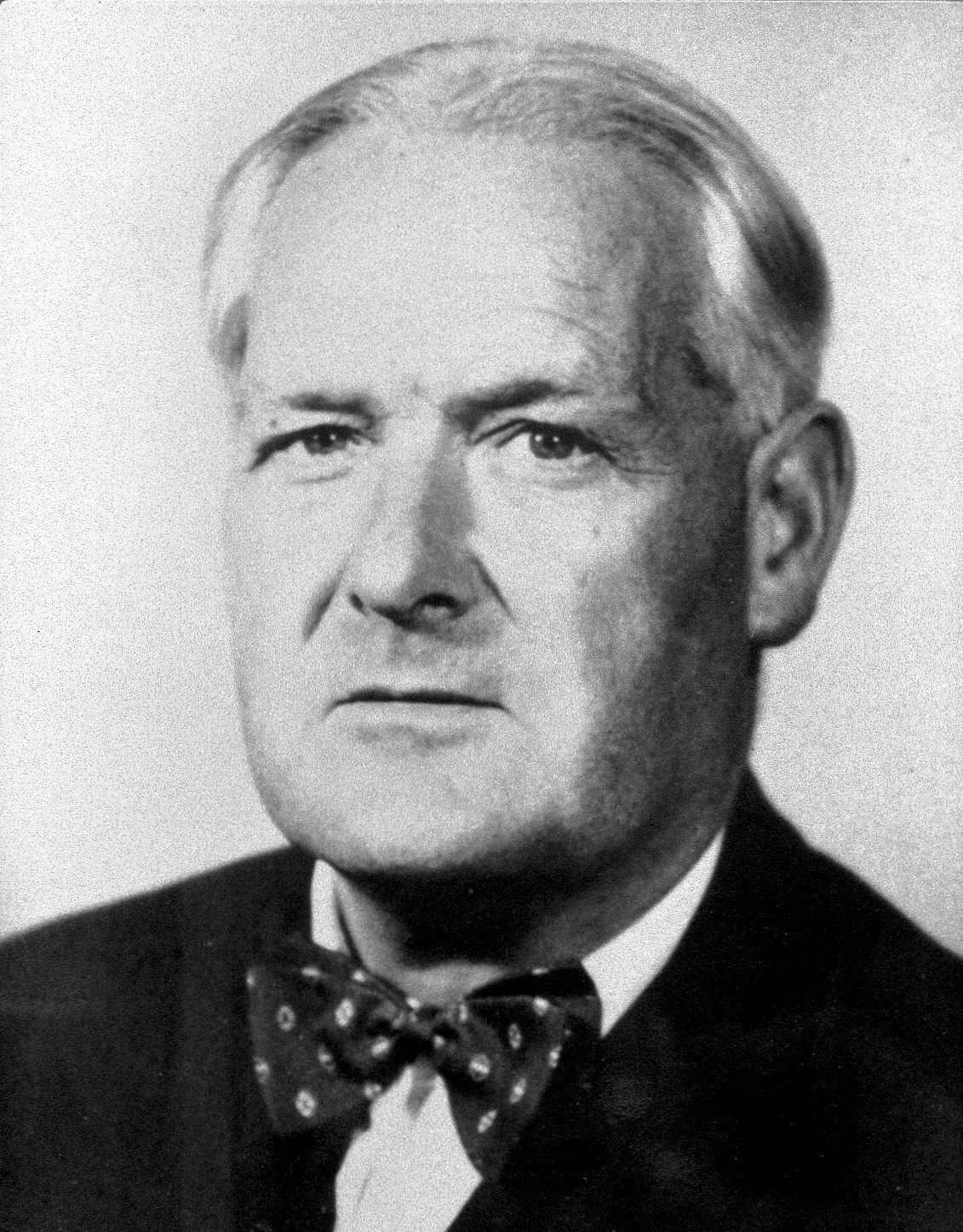
- Born: 8 July 1897; Hampstead, London, England
- Died: 18 April 1991 (aged 93); Ulverston, Cumbria, England
- Occupations: Epidemiologist statistician
- Known for: Randomised controlled trials; British Doctors Study of smoking; "Bradford Hill" criteria
- Awards: Guy Medal (Gold, 1953)

Sir Austin Bradford Hill (Note: Note that Austin Bradford Hill's surname was Hill and he went by the name "Tony". He published under the name "A.B. Hill" in early articles, "A. Bradford Hill" beginning in the 1930s (to distinguish himself from A.V. Hill), and "Sir Austin Bradford Hill" after he was knighted in 1961. He is often referred to as Bradford Hill, sometimes with a misleading hyphen as in "Bradford-Hill criteria.") CBE FRS (8 July 1897 – 18 April 1991) was an English epidemiologist who pioneered the modern randomised clinical trial and, together with Richard Doll, demonstrated the connection between cigarette smoking and lung cancer. Hill is widely known for the "Bradford Hill" criteria for considering whether an observed association is causal.

== Early life ==
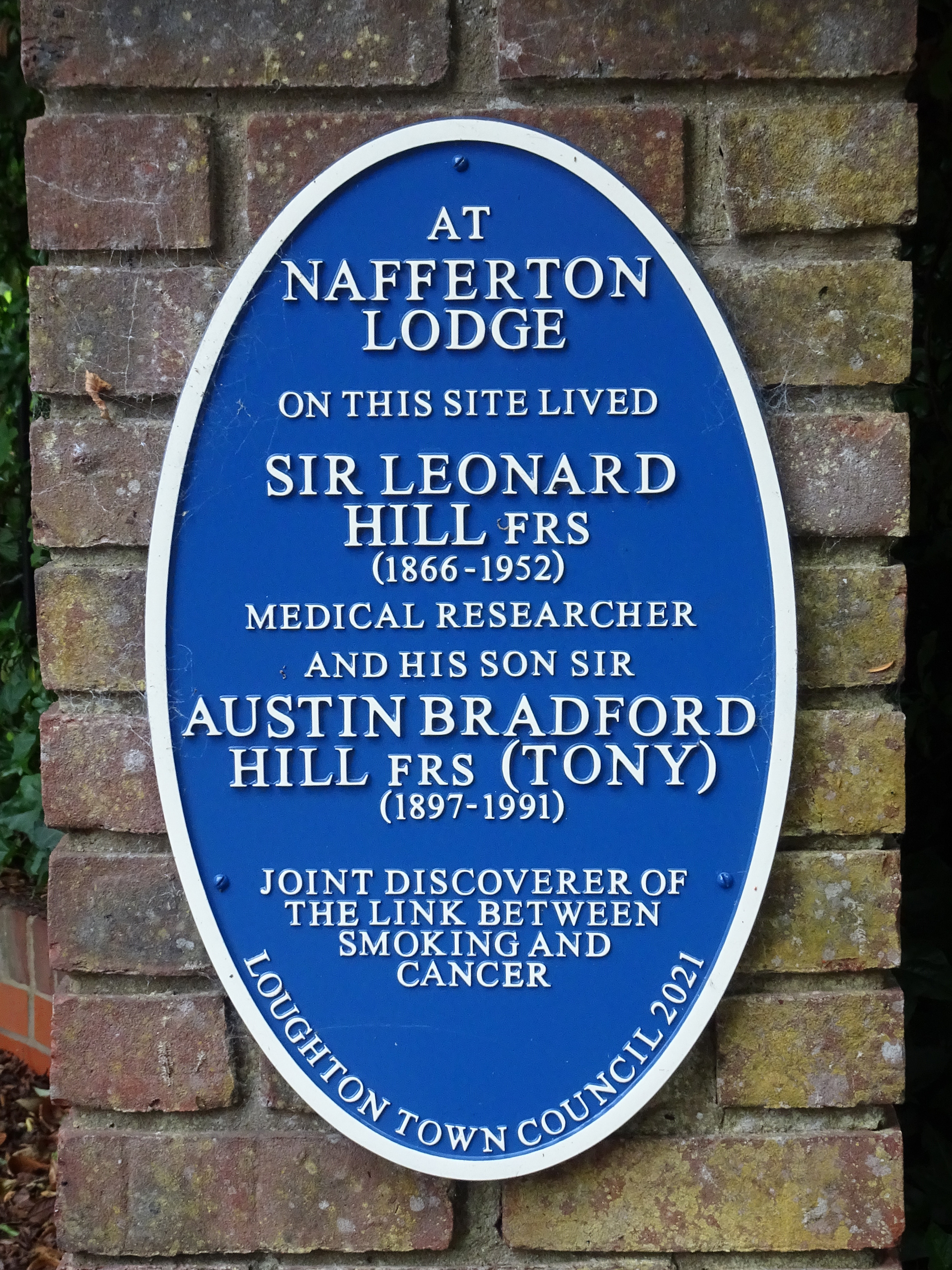
Blue plaque commemorating the family home in Loughton

Hill was born in London on 8 July 1897. He was one of the sons of Sir Leonard Erskine Hill FRS, a distinguished physiologist, and Janet Alexander. He was the grandson of noted scholar George Birkbeck Hill. As a child he lived at the family home, Osborne House, Loughton, Essex; he was educated at Chigwell School, Essex. He served as a pilot in the First World War but was invalided out when he contracted tuberculosis. Two years in hospital and two years of convalescence put a medical qualification out of the question and he took a degree in economics by correspondence at London University.

== Career ==
In 1922, Hill went to work for the Industry Fatigue Research Board. He was associated with the medical statistician Major Greenwood and, to improve his statistical knowledge, Hill attended lectures by Karl Pearson. When Greenwood accepted a chair at the newly formed London School of Hygiene and Tropical Medicine, Hill moved with him, becoming Reader in Epidemiology and Vital Statistics in 1933 and Professor of Medical Statistics in 1947. In 1947, he was appointed Honorary Director of the Medical Research Council's Statistical Research Unit.

Hill had a distinguished career in research and teaching and as author of a very successful textbook, Principles of Medical Statistics, but he is famous for several studies. First, he was the statistician on the Medical Research Council Streptomycin in Tuberculosis Trials Committee and their study evaluating the use of streptomycin in treating tuberculosis, is generally accepted as the first modern randomised clinical trial. The use of randomisation in agricultural experiments had been pioneered by Ronald Aylmer Fisher.

Secondly, he is known for a series of studies with Richard Doll on smoking and lung cancer. The first paper, published in 1950, was a case-control study comparing lung cancer patients with matched controls. Doll and Hill also started a long-term prospective study of smoking and health. This was an investigation of the smoking habits and health of 40,701 British doctors for several years (British doctors study). Fisher was in profound disagreement with the conclusions and procedures of the smoking/cancer work and from 1957 he criticised the work in the press and in academic publications.

In 1965, built upon the work of Hume and Popper, Hill suggested several aspects of causality in medicine and biology, which have remained in use by epidemiologists.

On Hill's death in 1991, Peter Armitage wrote, "to anyone involved in medical statistics, epidemiology or public health, Bradford Hill was quite simply the world's leading medical statistician."

== Honours ==
In 1950–52, Hill was president of the Royal Statistical Society. He was awarded its Guy Medal in Gold in 1953, and the Harben Gold Medal of the Institute of Public Health and Hygiene. The Society awards a medal in the field of medical statistics in Hill's name.

Hill was made a Fellow of the Royal Society (FRS) in 1954. Fisher was one of the proposers. The certificate of election read:

Has, by the application of statistical methods, made valuable contributions to our knowledge of the incidence and aetiology of industrial diseases, of the effects of internal migration upon mortality rates, and of the natural and experimental epidemiology of various infections, for example of the risks of an attack of poliomyelitis following inoculation procedures and of the risk of congenital abnormalities being precipitated by maternal rubella in the pregnant woman. Since the war he has demonstrated in an exact and controlled field survey the association between cigarette smoking and the incidence of cancer of the lung, and has been the leader in the development in medicine of the precise experimental methods now used nationally and internationally in the evaluation of new therapeutic and prophylactic agents.

He was appointed a Commander of the Order of the British Empire (CBE) in the 1951 Birthday Honours and knighted in the 1961 Birthday Honours.

== Bibliography ==
- "Principles of Medical Statistics" (1937) London: The Lancet, 1937.
- Doll, R.; Hill, A. B. (1 September 1950). "Smoking and Carcinoma of the Lung". British Medical Journal. 2 (4682): 739–748. doi:10.1136/bmj.2.4682.739. ISSN 0007-1447. PMC 2038856. PMID 14772469.
- Doll, R.; Hill, A. B. (1954). "The mortality of doctors in relation to their smoking habits; a preliminary report". British Medical Journal. 1 (4877): 1451–1455. doi:10.1136/bmj.1.4877.1451. PMC 2085438. PMID 13160495.
- Hill, A. B. (1965). "The Environment and Disease: Association or Causation?". Proceedings of the Royal Society of Medicine. 58 (5): 295–300. doi:10.1177/003591576505800503. PMC 1898525. PMID 14283879.
- Chalmers, I. (2003). "Fisher and Bradford Hill: Theory and pragmatism?". International Journal of Epidemiology. 32 (6): 922–924, discussion 924–8. doi:10.1093/ije/dyg295. PMID 14681246.
- Armitage, Peter (2003). "Fisher, Bradford Hill, and randomization". International Journal of Epidemiology. 32 (6): 925–928, discussion 928–8. doi:10.1093/ije/dyg286. PMID 14681247.
- Doll, R. (2003). "Fisher and Bradford Hill: Their personal impact". International Journal of Epidemiology. 32 (6): 929–931, discussion 931–8. doi:10.1093/ije/dyg287. PMID 14681248.
- "Fisher and Bradford Hill: A discussion". International Journal of Epidemiology. 32 (6): 945–948. 2003. doi:10.1093/ije/dyg316.
