= Henry William Macrosty =

President of the Royal Statistical Society between 1940–41

- Born: 1865
- Died: 19 January 1941

Henry William Macrosty (1865 – 19 January 1941) was President of the Royal Statistical Society between 1940–41.

Macrosty was active in the Fabian Society for many years, writing a proposed bill creating an eight-hour working day in 1893, "The Revival of Agriculture: a proposed policy for Great Britain" in 1905, and several other tracts for the society. From 1895 until 1906, he served on the society's executive.

== Works ==
- Henry William Macrosty (1907). The Trust Movement in British Industry: A Study of Business Organisation. Routledge/Thoemmes Press. ISBN 978-0-415-15087-3.

Bourgin, G. (1906-01-01). "Reviewed work: The trust movement in British industry. A study of business organisation, Henry W. MACROSTY". L'Année Sociologique. 11 (ArticleType: book–review / Full publication date: 1906–1909 / Copyright © 1906 Presses Universitaires de France): 616–620. ISSN 0245-9051. JSTOR 27883290.
F., O. (1907-06-01). "The Trust Movement in British Industry" (PDF). Journal of the Royal Statistical Society. 70 (2): 338–340. doi:10.2307/2339673. hdl:2027/pst.000055529570. ISSN 0952-8385. JSTOR 2339673.
Macgregor, D. H. (1907-09-01). "The Trust Movement in British Industry" (PDF). The Economic Journal. 17 (67): 381–383. doi:10.2307/2220478. hdl:2027/pst.000055529570. ISSN 0013-0133. JSTOR 2220478.
Wright, Chester W. (1908-01-01). "Reviewed work: The Trust Movement in British Industry, Henry W. Macrosty". Journal of Political Economy. 16 (1): 42–44. doi:10.1086/251387. ISSN 0022-3808. JSTOR 1820745.
Wiedenfeld, K. (1909-01-01). "Zur Charakteristik englischen Unternehmertums". Jahrbücher für Nationalökonomie und Statistik. Dritte Folge. 93 (1): 681–686. doi:10.1515/jbnst-1909-0149. ISSN 0021-4027. JSTOR 23826002. S2CID 157029691.
