= Statistical Society of Australia =

The Statistical Society of Australia (SSA) is the main professional organization for statisticians and related professionals in Australia. It was founded in 1962 to support and unify the work of Australian state statistical societies that were already in existence and had about 800 members in 2019. It has its own publishing arm, the Australian Statistical Publishing Association Inc. Its main publication is The Australian and New Zealand Journal of Statistics. The society currently has six state branches: Canberra, New South Wales, Queensland, South Australia, Victoria and Western Australia.

The SSA is an affiliated organisation of the International Statistical Institute.

The Society awards a gold medal, the Pitman Medal, at most once annually. It recognizes outstanding achievement in, and contribution to, the discipline of statistics. The Society runs the Australian Statistical Conference, which is held biennially over five days.

== Recipients of the Pitman Medal ==
- 1978 – E. J. G. Pitman
- 1980 – H.O. Lancaster
- 1982 – P. A. P. Moran
- 1986 – Edward J. Hannan
- 1988 – Chris Heyde
- 1990 – Peter Gavin Hall
- 1992 – A. James
- 1993 – E.J. Williams
- 1994 – J.M. Gani
- 1996 – W.J. Ewens
- 1998 – Eugene Seneta
- 2000 – G.N. Wilkinson
- 2002 – Terry Speed
- 2004 – Adrian Baddeley
- 2005 – J. Darroch
- 2006 – D.J. Daley
- 2008 – John Robinson
- 2010 – Geoffrey McLachlan
- 2012 – Alan Welsh
- 2013 – Matthew P Wand
- 2014 – Noel Cressie
- 2016 – Kerrie Mengersen
- 2018 – Louise Ryan
- 2021 – Rob J. Hyndman

(source)
