= P. A. P. Moran =

Australian statistician (1917–1988)

Pat Moran
- Patrick Alfred Pierce Moran
- Born: 14 July 1917; King's Cross, Sydney, Australia
- Died: 19 September 1988 (aged 71); Canberra, Australia
- Education: University of Sydney; University of Cambridge
- Known for: Population genetics
- Father: Herbert Michael Moran
- Awards: Thomas Ranken Lyle Medal (1963), Fellow of the Royal Society
- Scientific career
- Fields: Mathematician
- Workplaces: CSIRO; Oxford University; ANU
- Doctoral advisor: Abram Besicovitch
- Doctoral students: Warren Ewens; Edward J. Hannan; Chris Heyde; Charles E. M. Pearce; Eugene Seneta; Susan R. Wilson; and about 16 others

Patrick Alfred Pierce Moran FRS (14 July 1917 – 19 September 1988) was an Australian statistician who made significant contributions to probability theory and its application to population and evolutionary genetics.

== Early years ==
Patrick Moran was born in Sydney and was the only child of Herbert Michael Moran (b. 1885 in Sydney, d. 1945 in Cambridge UK), a prominent surgeon and captain of the first Wallabies, and Eva Mann (b. 1887 in Sydney, d. 1977 in Sydney). Patrick did have five other siblings, but they all died at or shortly after birth. He completed his high school studies in Bathurst, in three and a half years instead of the normal five-year course. At age 16, in 1934, he commenced study at the University of Sydney where he studied chemistry, math and physics, graduating with first class honours in mathematics in 1937. Following graduation he went to study at Cambridge University from 1937 to 1939, his supervisors noted that he was not a good mathematician and the outbreak of World War II interrupted his studies. He graduated with an MA (by proxy) from St John's College, Cambridge, on 22 January 1943 and continued his studies there from 1945 to 1946. He was admitted to Balliol College, Oxford University, on 3 December 1946. He was awarded an MA, from Oxford University, by incorporation in 1947.

== Career ==
During the war Moran worked in rocket development in the Ministry of Supply and later at the External Ballistics Laboratory in Cambridge. In late 1943 he joined the Australian Scientific Liaison Office (ASLO), run by the CSIRO. He worked on applied physics including vision, camouflage, army signals, quality control, road research, infra-red detection, metrology, UHF radio propagation, general radar, bomb-fragmentation, rockets, ASDICs and on operational research. He also wrote some papers on the Hausdorff measure during the War.

After the war, Moran returned to Cambridge where he was supervised by Frank Smithies and worked unsuccessfully on determining the nature of the set of points of divergence of Fourier integrals of functions in the class L^{p}, when 1 < p < 2. He gave up on this project and was employed as a senior research officer at the Institute of Statistics at Oxford University. He also gave lecture courses. Patrick Moran was appointed university lecturer in mathematics in 1951, at Oxford, without stipend, for as long as he held the post of senior research officer in the Institute of Statistics. Moran freely admitted he had difficulty with simple arithmetic and wrote that, "Arithmetic I could not do".

He married in 1946 after his appointment; he and his wife Jean Mavis Frame had three children, Louise, Michael and Hugh. At Oxford Moran wrote several papers on the nonlinear breeding cycle of the Canadian lynx. He was made a lecturer at Oxford in 1951 but left the university later that year for Australia. He never acquired a PhD, "a fact he would recall with some pride in later life", recalls Hall.

On 1 January 1951, Moran was appointed foundation professor of statistics in the Research School of Social Sciences at the Australian National University in Canberra. He worked on the stochastic study of dam theory, and on population genetics, publishing his first paper "Random processes in genetics" in the Proceedings of the Cambridge Philosophical Society in 1958 and culminating in his 1962 book The Statistical Processes of Evolutionary Theory. He also worked on geometric probability.

In 1963, he was awarded the Thomas Ranken Lyle Medal by the Australian Academy of Science.

He retired from ANU at the end of 1982; he stayed on as Emeritus Professor and worked on statistical methods in particular epidemiological methods and their application to psychiatry. He was awarded an honorary ScD degree from Cambridge, on 29 October 1963, and a DSc from Sydney. He was made a Fellow of the Royal Society in 1975.

Moran died after a stroke in 1988. The P.A.P Moran Building (Building 26B) at A.N.U. was named in his honour. It houses offices of the Mathematical Sciences Institute, tutorial rooms and the Research School of Economics. The Moran Medal, created in his honour, is awarded by the Australian Academy of Science every two years for distinguished work in statistics by an Australian statistician.

== See also ==
- Moran's I
- Moran process
- Moran's theorem

== Publications ==
In addition to over 170 papers, Moran wrote four books,

- The Theory of Storage (1959; translated into Russian, 1963; Czech, 1967)
- The Statistical Processes of Evolutionary Theory (1962; translated into Russian, 1973)
- (With M.G. Kendall) Geometrical Probability (1963; translated into Russian, 1972)
- An Introduction to Probability Theory (1967)
