= Melanie Bahlo =

Australian geneticist

Melanie Bahlo AM FAHMS
- Born: Germany
- Education: BSc Hons and PhD in population genetics from Monash University
- Title: Professor, Theme Leader (Healthy Development and Ageing) and Laboratory Head
- Scientific career
- Workplaces: WEHI, Parkville, VIC

Melanie Bahlo is an Australian statistical geneticist and bioinformatician.

== Biography ==
Bahlo's interest in science and biology developed at a very young age. Growing up in Germany, she used to record the birds that came and visited her bird feeder during winter. Bahlo attended secondary school at Albury High School in Albury, Australia. She received her PhD in population genetics from Monash University in 1997. Bahlo's research interests include statistics, genetics, bioinformatics, and population genetics. Her work has "led to the discovery of new genes involved in genetic diseases such as deafness and epilepsy". She is a member of the team of scientists affiliated with the Lowy Medical Research Institute (LMRI) studying the genetic basis for macular telangiectasia type 2. She directed the most recent Genome Wide Association Study (GWAS), which discovered common genetic variants associated with MacTel.

Professor Bahlo is Theme Leader and Laboratory Head at WEHI, where her groups work focusses on developing and applying state-of-the-art methods to understand complex genetic datasets to discover the genetic causes of human disorders such as epilepsy, ataxia, dementia, motor neuron disease, Parkinson’s disease, speech disorders and retinal disorders.

The work of Bahlo and her team has recently focussed on brain and retinal disorders but previous work has included infectious organisms. Software developed by the Bahlo lab is freely available to other researchers. Bahlo spoke publicly about the challenges of data access in the genome research space, and the importance of repositories for genome data, especially for injecting global equity in genomic data sharing.

Bahlo and colleagues (Mark Bennett and Haloom Rafehi) from WEHI (formally known as the Walter and Eliza Hall Institute of Medical Research) were members of an international consortium responsible for discovering two new gene mutations responsible for a rare type of epilepsy.

Bahlo and colleagues also undertook pivotal work identifying five genetic risk locations in people who may be at risk of an inherited eye disease that can cause blindness, Macular Telangiectasia type 2.

== Awards ==
- 2024 Victorian Honour Roll of Women
- 2023 Member of the Order of Australia in the 2023 King's Birthday Honours for "significant service to genetic and infectious disease research, and to public health"
- 2020 Fellow of the Australian Academy of Health and Medical Sciences
- 2010 Future Fellowship, Australian Research Council
- 2010 Senior Research Fellowship National Health and Medical Research Council
- 2009 Moran Medal, Australian Academy of Science
- 2009–present Craven and Shearer Award, Walter and Eliza Hall Institute

== Grants ==
- 2014–2018 Program Grant "Computational and statistical bioinformatics for medical 'omics'", National Health and Medical Research Council
- 2008–2012 Program Grant "Genetic and Bioinformatic Analysis of Complex Human Diseases", National Health and Medical Research Council

== Service to the community ==
- 2014 Panel Member, Marsden Fund New Zealand
- 2014 Australian and New Zealand Association for the Advancement of Science Lecture: "Using statistics to find the causes of inherited diseases"
- 2014 Invited attendee "Translation of Omics-Based Discoveries into Clinical Research and Practice", Workshop, National Health and Medical Research Council
- 2014 Gene Technology Access Centre Afternoon Tea with Victorian Teachers
- 2014 Gene Technology Access Centre Year 9 Students "Meet the scientists"

== Memberships ==
- Human Genetics Society of Australia
- American Society for Human Genetics
- Statistical Society of Australia
- International Statistics Institute
- Royal Statistical Society
