= Jean Yang =

Australian statistician & academic

Jean Yee Hwa Yang FRSN is an Australian statistician known for her work on variance reduction for microarrays, and for inferring proteins from mass spectrometry data. Yang is a Professor in the School of Mathematics and Statistics at the University of Sydney.

== Education and career ==
Yang earned a bachelor's degree with first class honours and a University Medal from the University of Sydney in 1996, in mathematics and statistics.

After working for half a year at the Commonwealth Scientific and Industrial Research Organisation, Yang then went to the University of California, Berkeley, for graduate study, completing her Ph.D. in statistics in 2002. Her dissertation, "Statistical methods in the design and analysis of gene expression data from cDNA microarray experiment", was supervised by Terry Speed.

Yang did postdoctoral research in biostatistics and bioinformatics with Mark R. Segal at the University of California, San Francisco, where she became an assistant professor in 2003. In 2005, she returned to the University of Sydney with a faculty position.

== Recognition ==
In 2015, Yang was the winner of the Moran Medal of the Australian Academy of Science for her "significant contributions to the development of statistical methodology for analyzing molecular data arising in contemporary biomedical research". She was elected a Fellow of the Royal Society of New South Wales in 2025.

== Selected publications ==
- Yang, Yee Hwa; Speed, Terry (2002), "Design issues for cDNA microarray experiments", Nature Reviews Genetics, 3 (8): 579–588, doi:10.1038/nrg863, PMID 12154381, S2CID 260480
- Dudoit, Sandrine; Yang, Yee Hwa; Callow, Matthew J.; Speed, Terence P. (2002), "Statistical methods for identifying differentially expressed genes in replicated cDNA microarray experiments", Statistica Sinica, 12 (1): 111–139, JSTOR 24307038, MR 1894191
- Yang, Yee Hwa; Dudoit, Sandrine; Luu, Percy; Lin, David M.; Peng, Vivian; Ngai, John; Speed, Terence P. (2002), "Normalization for cDNA microarray data: a robust composite method addressing single and multiple slide systematic variation", Nucleic Acids Research, 30 (4): e15, doi:10.1093/nar/30.4.e15, PMC 100354, PMID 11842121
- Gentleman, Robert C.; Carey, Vincent J.; Bates, Douglas M.; Bolstad, Ben; Dettling, Marcel; Dudoit, Sandrine; Ellis, Byron; Gautier, Laurent; Ge, Yongchao; Gentry, Jeff; Hornik, Kurt; Hothorn, Torsten; Huber, Wolfgang; Iacus, Stefano; Irizarry, Rafael; Leisch, Friedrich; Li, Cheng; Maechler, Martin; Rossini, Anthony J.; Sawitzki, Gunther; Smith, Colin; Smyth, Gordon; Tierney, Luke; Yang, Jean Y. H.; Zhang, Jianhua (2004), "Bioconductor: open software development for computational biology and bioinformatics", Genome Biology, 5 (10): R80, doi:10.1186/gb-2004-5-10-r80, PMC 545600, PMID 15461798
