= Thomas Ranken Lyle Medal =

Award of the Australian Academy of Science

The Thomas Ranken Lyle Medal is awarded at most every two years by the Australian Academy of Science to a mathematician or physicist for his or her outstanding research accomplishments. It is named after Thomas Ranken Lyle, an Irish mathematical physicist who became a professor at the University of Melbourne. The award takes the form of a bronze medal bearing the design of the head of Thomas Lyle, as sculpted by Rayner Hoff.

The medal was founded by the Australian National Research Council (ANRC) in 1932, and first awarded in 1935. When the Australian Academy of Science was established in 1954, it took over the roles of the ANRC, including administration of the medal.

== Recipients ==
Year	Recipients	Contribution
1935	John Raymond Wilton	
1941	George Henry Briggs	
1941	Thomas Gerald Room	
1947	John Conrad Jaeger	
1947	David Forbes Martyn	atmospheric tides
1949	Keith Edward Bullen	
1951	Thomas MacFarland Cherry	
1953	Joseph Lade Pawsey	
1957	Bernard Y. Mills	
1959	Eric Barnes	
1961	H. O. Lancaster	
1963	Graeme Reade Anthony Ellis	
1963	Patrick A. P. Moran	
1966	Stuart Thomas Butler	nuclear reaction theory, plasma physics, and atmospheric tides
1968	George Szekeres	"a wide range of mathematical disciplines" including fractional iteration of functions, numerical integration, graph theory, and relativistic kinematics
1970	Robert Hanbury Brown	
1972	Hans Buchdahl	
1975	John Paul Wild	radio astronomy of the sun
1977	Kurt Mahler	number theory
1979	Edward J. Hannan	statistics of stationary processes
1981	John R. Philip	
1981	Derek W. Robinson	
1983	Rodney J. Baxter	
1985	Allan Snyder	
1987	Donald Melrose	
1989	Robert Delbourgo	
1989	Peter Gavin Hall	
1991	Bruce H.J. McKellar	
1993	Neville Horner Fletcher	
1993	Erich Weigold	
1995	Chris Heyde	martingale limit theory
1997	Anthony W. Thomas	quarks and nucleon structure
1999	Ernie Tuck	
2001	Ian Sloan	
2003	George Dracoulis	nuclear structure
2005	Anthony J. Guttmann	
2007	Yuri Kivshar	nonlinear optics
2009	Victor V. Flambaum	unified field theory, parity violations, fundamental constants
2011	James Stanislaus Williams	
2013	Cheryl Praeger	
2015	Michelle Simmons	
2017	Joss Bland-Hawthorn	Establishment of the fields of galactic archaeology and astrophotonics
2019	Chennupati Jagadish	semiconductor physics (semiconductor lasers, infrared and terahertz detectors based on quantum wells, quantum dots and nanowires)
2021	David McClelland	Detecting gravitational waves
2023	Susan Scott	mathematics and physics
2023	Nick Wormald	mathematics and physics
2025	George A. Willis	totally disconnected locally compact groups

== See also ==
- List of mathematics awards
- List of physics awards
