= Chris Heyde =

Australian statistician

Chris Heyde AM
- Born: 20 April 1939; Sydney, Australia
- Died: 6 March 2008 (aged 68); Canberra, Australia
- Education: The Australian National University
- Scientific career
- Fields: Probability theory, Stochastic processes, Statistics
- Workplaces: Columbia University, University of Melbourne, CSIRO, University of Manchester, University of Sheffield, Michigan State University, The Australian National University, Canberra.
- Doctoral advisor: Patrick Alfred Pierce Moran

Christopher Charles Heyde (20 April 1939 in Sydney – 6 March 2008 in Canberra) was a prominent Australian statistician who did leading research in probability, stochastic processes and statistics.

Heyde was a professor at Columbia University, the University of Melbourne, CSIRO, University of Manchester, University of Sheffield, Michigan State University, and The Australian National University, Canberra.

In 2008, Heyde died of metastatic melanoma.

== Honours ==
- 1972 – Member of the International Statistical Institute
- 1973 – Fellow of the Institute of Mathematical Statistics
- 1977 – Fellow of the Australian Academy of Science (FAA)
- 1981 – Honorary Life Member of the Statistical Society of Australia Inc. (SSAI)
- 1988 – Awarded the Statistical Society of Australia's Pitman Medal and served as President of the Society
- 1994 – Shared the Australian Academy of Science's Hannan Medal with Peter Hall.
- 1995 – Thomas Ranken Lyle Medal of the Australian Academy of Science.
- 1998 – D.Sc. honoris causa, University of Sydney
- 2003 – Fellow of the Academy of the Social Sciences in Australia (FASSA)
- 2003 – Appointed Member of the Order of Australia (AM) "for service to mathematics, particularly through research into statistics and probability, and to the advancement of learning in these disciplines".

== Offices held ==
- Vice President of the International Statistical Institute
- President of the Bernoulli Society
- President of the Statistical Society of Australia (1979–1981)
- Vice President of the Australian Mathematical Society
- Editor of the Australian Journal of Statistics
- Editor of Stochastic Processes and Their Applications (1983–1989)
- Editor-in-chief of Journal of Applied Probability (1990–2008)
- Editor-in-chief of Advances in Applied Probability (1990–2008).
