= Kim-Anh Lê Cao =

Australian statistician and computational biologist

Kim-Anh Lê Cao is a French and Australian statistician and computational biologist whose research applies multivariate statistics and dimension reduction to omics data analysis. She is a professor in the School of Mathematics and Statistics at the University of Melbourne.

== Education and career ==
Lê Cao is originally from France, of Vietnamese descent. She completed a Ph.D. in France in 2007, at the Institut national des sciences appliquées de Toulouse. Her dissertation, Outils statistiques pour la sélection de variables et l'intégration de données "omiques", was sustained under the joint direction of Philippe Besse and Christèle Robert-Granié.

After moving to Australia, she worked from 2008 to 2017 at the University of Queensland as a postdoctoral fellow in the Institute for Molecular Bioscience, a research biostatistician, and a National Health and Medical Research Council (NHMRC) Fellow and group leader in the Diamantina Institute. Next, she obtained a second NHMRC Fellowship taking her to the School of Mathematics and Statistics at the University of Melbourne, as group leader for Melbourne Integrative Genomics. In 2020 she became an NHMRC Career Development Fellow and Associate Professor at the University of Melbourne, and she has since become a full professor.

== Book ==
Lê Cao is a coauthor of the book Multivariate Data Integration Using R: Methods and Applications with the mixOmics Package (with Zoe Marie Welham, CRC Press, 2022).

== Recognition ==
Lê Cao was a 2019 recipient of the Moran Medal of the Australian Academy of Science, and of the Georgina Sweet Awards for Women in Quantitative Biomedical Science.
