= Henry Lancaster =

Henry Lancaster may refer to:

- Henry Carrington Lancaster (1882–1954), American scholar of French literature
- Henry Oliver Lancaster (1913–2001), Australian mathematical statistician
- Henry IV of England (1367–1413), reigned from 1399 to 1413
- Henry V of England (1386–1422), reigned from 1413 to 1422
- Henry VI of England (1421–1471), reigned from 1422 to 1461 and again from 1470 to 1471
