= Warren Ewens =

Australian mathematician (born 1937)

Warren Ewens AO FRS FAA
- Born: 23 January 1937 (age 89); Canberra, Australia
- Education: University of Melbourne, Australian National University (Ph.D.)
- Known for: Ewens's sampling formula
- Awards: Pitman Medal; Weldon Memorial Prize
- Scientific career
- Fields: Mathematical biology
- Workplaces: La Trobe University; Monash University; University of Pennsylvania
- Thesis: Stochastic processes in population genetics (1963)
- Doctoral advisor: P. A. P. Moran

Warren John Ewens (born 23 January 1937 in Canberra) is an Australian-born mathematician who has been Professor of Biology at the University of Pennsylvania since 1997. (He also held that position 1972–1977.) He concentrates his research on the mathematical, statistical and theoretical aspects of population genetics. Ewens has worked in mathematical population genetics, computational biology, and evolutionary population genetics. He introduced Ewens's sampling formula.

Ewens received a B.A. (1958) and M.A. (1960) in Mathematical Statistics from the University of Melbourne, where he was a resident student at Trinity College, and a Ph.D. from the Australian National University (1963) under P. A. P. Moran. He first joined the department of biology at the University of Pennsylvania in 1972, and in 2006 was named the Christopher H. Browne Distinguished Professor of Biology. Positions held include:

- 1967–1972 Foundation Chair and Professor of Mathematics at La Trobe University
- 1972–1977 Professor of Biology at the University of Pennsylvania
- 1978–1996 Chair and Professor of Mathematics at Monash University
- 1997– Professor of Biology at the University of Pennsylvania

Ewens is a Fellow of the Royal Society and the Australian Academy of Science. He is also the recipient of the Australian Statistical Society's E.J. Pitman Medal (1996), and Oxford University's Weldon Memorial Prize. His teaching and mentoring at the University of Pennsylvania have also been recognized by awards.

Ewens also participates in the Genomics and Computational Biology (GCB) Ph.D. program of the University of Pennsylvania School of Medicine.

Since 2006, he has taught statistics at the University of Pennsylvania's Wharton School.

In 2022, Ewens was appointed Officer of the Order of Australia in the 2022 Queen's Birthday Honours for "distinguished service to biology and data science, to research, and to tertiary education".

== Publications ==
Ewens has produced many publications; the following is a small selection:

- Ewens W.J. (1972). "The sampling theory of selectively neutral alleles". Theoretical Population Biology. 3 (1): 87–112. Bibcode:1972TPBio...3...87E. doi:10.1016/0040-5809(72)90035-4. PMID 4667078.
- Ewens W.J. (2004). Mathematical Population Genetics (2nd ed.). Springer-Verlag, New York. ISBN 0-387-20191-2.
- 'Statistical Methods in Bioinformatics: An Introduction (Statistics for Biology and Health)'
- 'Kingman and mathematical population genetics' in 'Probability and mathematical genetics' edited by N.H. Bingham and C.M. Goldie
- 'Genetics and Analysis of Quantitative Traits', American Journal of Human Biology 1999
- 'On estimating P values by Monte Carlo methods' American Journal of Human Genetics 2003
- 'Sam Karlin and the stochastic theory of evolutionary population genetics' Theoretical Population Biology 2009

== See also ==
- Ewens's sampling formula (the multivariate Ewens distribution)
