= Adrian G. Barnett =

British born Australian statistician

- Born: January 1973; Northampton, UK
- Education: University College London BSc (Hon); University of Queensland (PhD)
- Scientific career
- Fields: meta-research; research funding; data sharing; peer review; reducing research waste
- Workplaces: Queensland University of Technology
- Thesis: On the Use of the Bispectrum to Detect and Model Non-linearity (2002)
- Doctoral advisor: Rodney Carl Wolff
- Website: staff.qut.edu.au/staff/a.barnett

Adrian Gerard Barnett FASSA (born 1973) is a professor in the faculty of Health in the school of Public Health and Social Work, at Queensland University of Technology and was president of the Statistical Society of Australia from 2018 to 2020.

== Early life and education ==
Adrian Gerard Barnett was born in Northampton, England in January 1973. He was awarded a first class honours B.Sc. in statistics from the University College London in 1994. On graduating from UCL he worked as a statistician for SmithKline Beecham and for the Medical Research Council (of Great Britain) before moving to Australia to study for his Ph.D. in mathematics. He was awarded a Ph.D. in 2002 by the University of Queensland.

== Career ==
Barnett is committed to open research and concerned to make medical science more reproducible and less wasteful and, together with colleagues, lodges prospective study protocols on F1000Research where they can be critiqued by the worldwide community. In part, as a result of this commitment, he collaborates with scientists from New Zealand, from China, from the US, as well as from Australia.

He has published articles on environmental health, in particular, on the effects of high temperatures on work related injuries, on death rates, on other temperature-related health issues, and on the statistical methods for the analysis of such data. Much of his work has been towards improving hospitals. Air pollution and its effects on health is another area to which he and his colleagues have made many contributions.

His work on public health has meant that he enters the public arena in order to bring scientific knowledge into the public debate. Thus at the time of the 2014 Hazelwood mine fire in the Latrobe Valley, Barnett publicly criticised the handling of the fire, arguing that at least 11 additional deaths resulted from the long-burning fire and its toxic smoke. He served as an expert witness in the inquiry which followed.

Barnett has criticised air quality standards in Australia as giving apparently safe cut-offs for air pollution concentrations whereas his and others' work shows that there are no safe levels for air pollutants, and thus the "standards" increase the health risks to all Australians. He has used The Conversation to further discuss issues concerning the toxicity of air pollution.

In November 2021 Barnett was elected Fellow of the Academy of the Social Sciences in Australia.

== Selected publications ==
- Barnett, A. & Dobson, A.J. (2010). Analysing Seasonal Health Data. Dordrecht: Springer.
- Dobson, A.J. & Barnett, A. (2018). An introduction to generalized linear models (4 ed.). Chapman and Hall.
