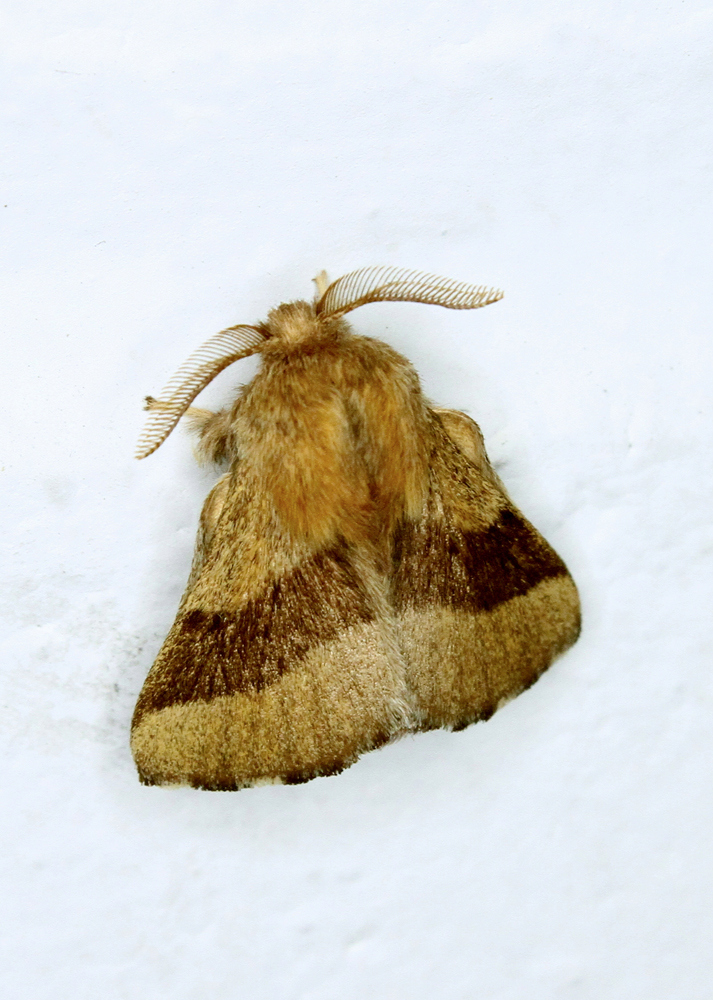
- Adult
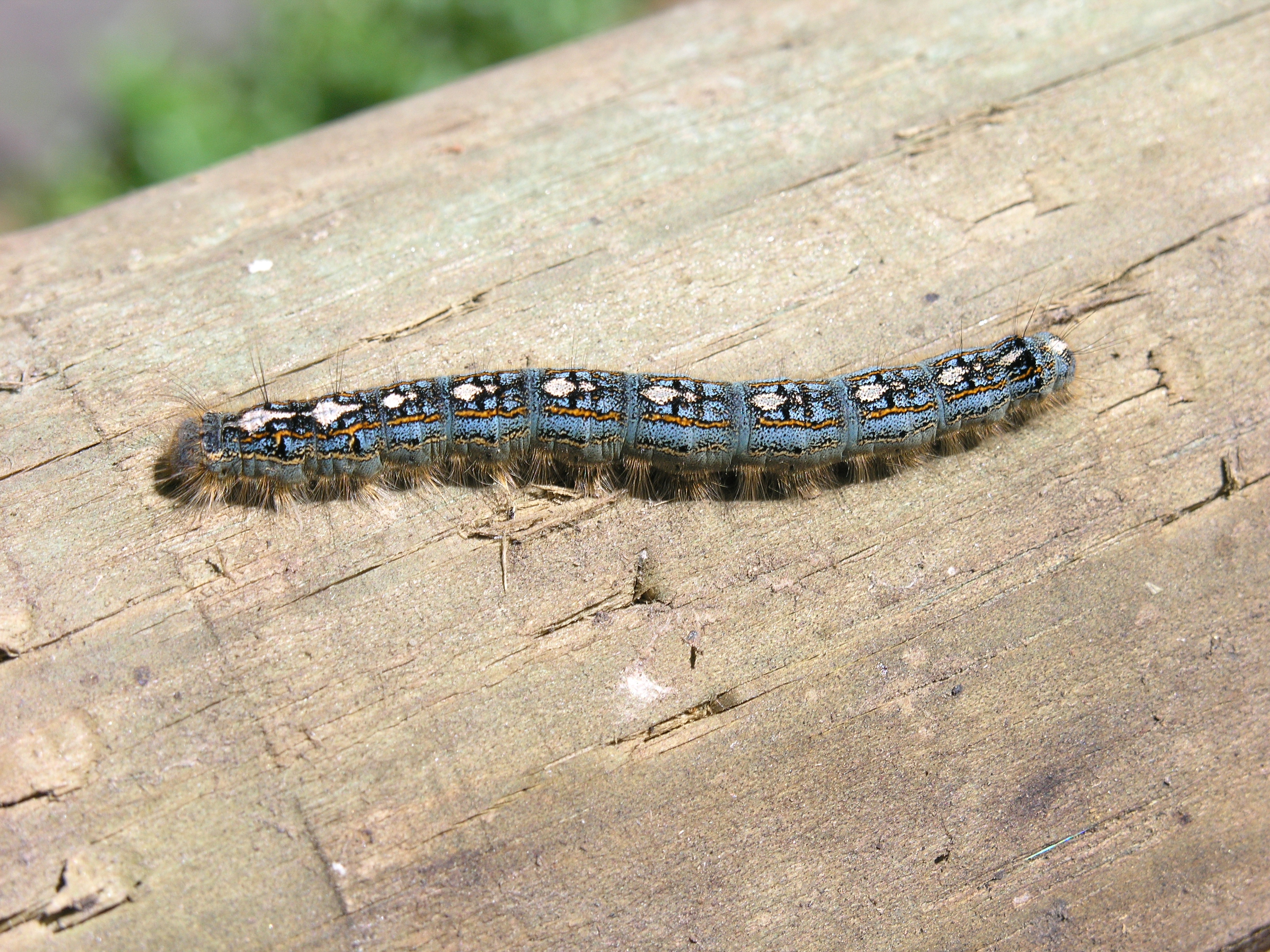
- Larva

Scientific classification
- Kingdom: Animalia
- Phylum: Arthropoda
- Clade: Pancrustacea
- Class: Insecta
- Order: Lepidoptera
- Family: Lasiocampidae
- Genus: Malacosoma
- Species: M. disstria

Binomial name
- Malacosoma disstria Hübner, 1820

Synonyms
- Malacosoma disstria; Chelonia nubilis Guérin-Méneville, [1832]; Clisiocampa silvatica Harris, 1841; Bombyx drupacearum Boisduval, 1868; Clisiocampa erosa Stretch, 1881; Clisiocampa disstria var. thoracicoides Neumoegen & Dyar, 1893; Clisiocampa erosa var. sylvaticoides Neumoegen & Dyar, 1893; Clisiocampa erosa var. perversa Neumoegen & Dyar, 1893

= Forest tent caterpillar moth =

Species of insect

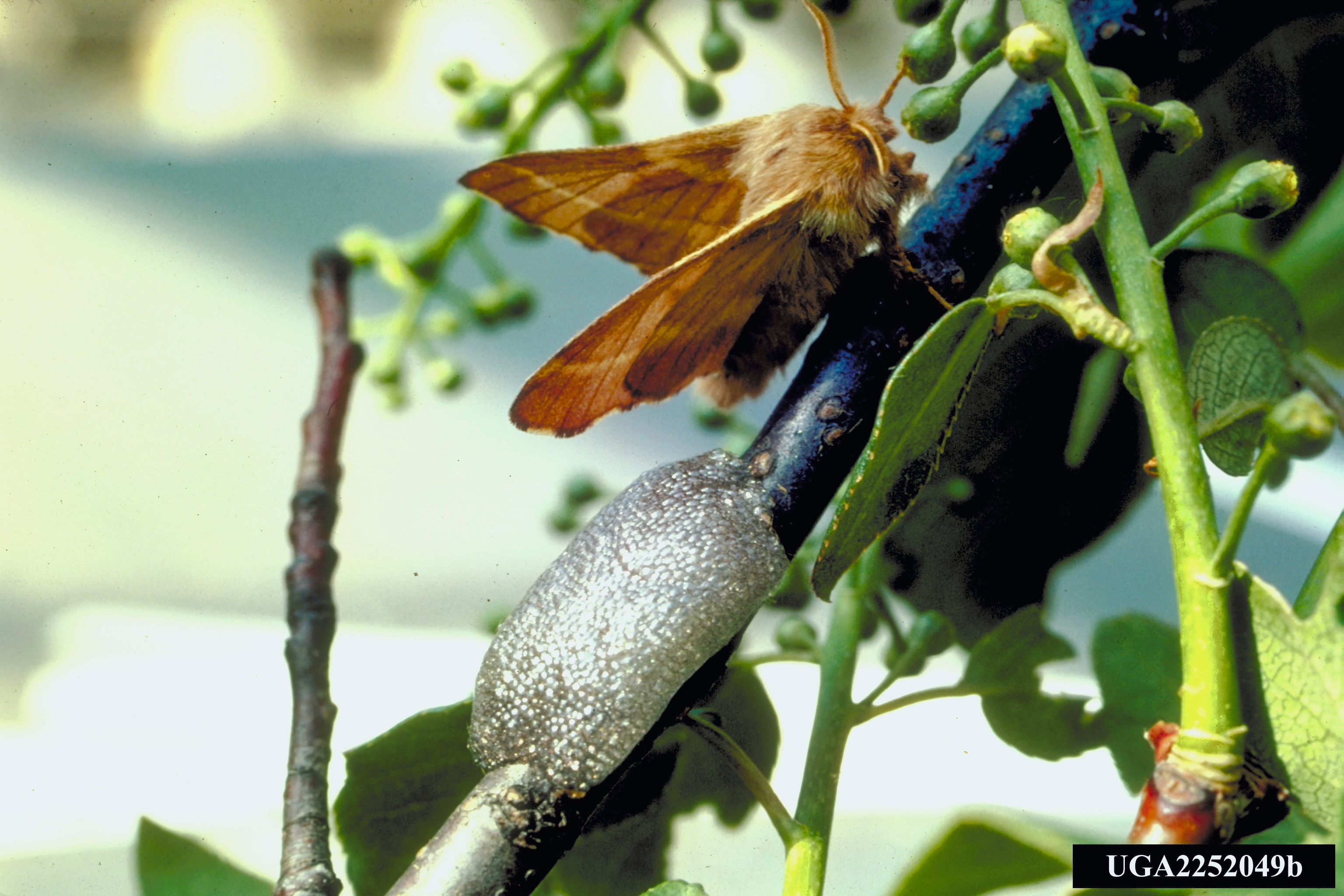
Adult and egg mass

The forest tent caterpillar moth (Malacosoma disstria) is a moth found throughout North America, especially in the eastern regions. Unlike related tent caterpillar species, the larvae of forest tent caterpillars do not make tents, but rather, weave a silky sheet where they lie together during molting. They also lay down strands of silk as they move over branches and travel as groups along these pheromone-containing silk trails. The caterpillars are social, traveling together to feed and massing as a group at rest. Group behavior diminishes as the caterpillars increase in size, so that by the fifth instar (molt) the caterpillars are feeding and resting independently.

The adult moths of this species favor oak, sweetgum, tupelo, aspen, and sugar maple for egg laying in the summer. The females lay eggs in masses of up to 300, which are stuck to twigs and covered with a gluey cement called spumaline, which prevents them from desiccating and freezing. Eggs hatch the following spring. The larvae can be found feeding on many other species of deciduous trees or shrubs. High population density outbreaks tend to recur at reasonably regular intervals every decade or so and usually last two to three years, during which time trees and shrubs can be almost completely denuded of leaves. Most plants replace the lost leaves without permanent damage.

== Description ==
Mature (pre-pupating) larvae are 2 to 2.5 inches (50 to 64 mm) in length. The caterpillars are black, dark brown, or gray, with broad blue longitudinal stripes and thin yellow stripes extending along each side. The back of each abdominal segment bears a white spot that is wider toward the head end. The sides are partially covered with fur-like long setae. The adult moth that emerges after pupation is yellow or tan with a thick, short, furry body. The wingspan is about 1.5 inches (30 mm). Coloration is similar for males and females. The female's body is larger than the male's.

The insect is native to North America.

== Biology ==
The forest tent caterpillar moth is nocturnal, taking flight soon after nightfall and returning to rest before dawn. It is not known how far an egg-laden female can fly, but there is one credible report of this species flying hundreds of kilometers with the assistance of an unusually strong wind.

=== Larval stages ===
The social caterpillars of M. disstria are nomadic and forage as a group. The fifty to two hundred larvae that result from a single egg-mass live together for most of their larval stages. Trails of silk heavily loaded with pheromones secreted by other colony members induce larvae to move, while the close presence of other colony members brings them to quiescence. This indicates that there are social cues that are used to increase the locomotive efficiency of each individual larva. Pupation occurs after caterpillars reach a size threshold that is attained more quickly when caterpillars forage in groups. This is particularly important since delayed development to threshold increases the risks of predation and food depletion. However, as larvae proceed into the later instars, they become increasingly independent and by the fifth instar rarely form aggregations. This ontogenetic change in gregariousness results from an increase in the costs of maintaining grouping due to changes related to predation, thermoregulation, silk production, and foraging.

==== Thermoregulation ====
Forest tent caterpillars are ectotherms so they rely on sources of heat from the environment to raise their body temperatures. In order to do this, they bask together and benefit from group thermoregulation. Elevating body temperature is essential in increasing metabolic rates for movement and food processing, so proper thermoregulation leads to an increased rate of development. This is very important for M. distria caterpillars, which rely on fast growth in spite of low environmental temperatures to benefit from the high food quality and the smaller predation risk in the spring. Thus, it is an adaptive advantage to bask in groups. However, as caterpillars grow, thermoregulatory needs decrease and the benefit of group living is gradually overridden by other factors such as food competition.

== Behavior ==
=== Foraging ===
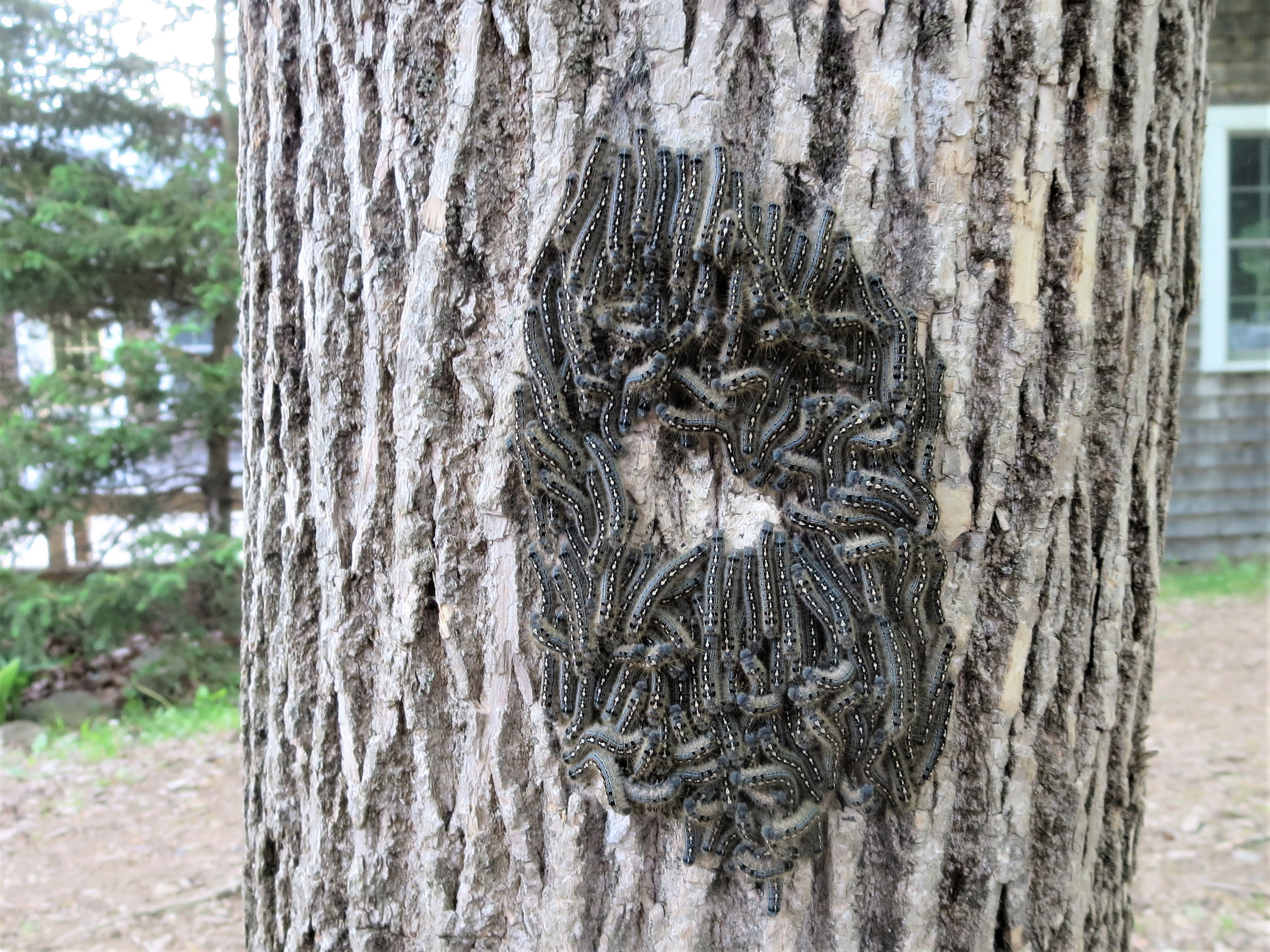
Forest tent caterpillars massing on a tree trunk

Eating times are variable. Foraging trips can occur at any time and are very coordinated: either the entire colony forages or no one does. A small proportion of starved individuals is enough to reach agreement and start group movement. However, this organized behavior and the high fidelity of caterpillars to pheromone hormone trails imply conservative foraging, which may trap caterpillars to poor food sources even if a better one is close by. Some plasticity in this behavior has been reported, which is modulated by the presence of caterpillars that are behaviorally more exploratory or that simply become more adventurous because they are starved, increasing foraging flexibility. With age, competition for food becomes more important, especially as resources become scarce. Grouping decreases growth rate via a decrease in food intake so ontogenetic changes toward more mobility and independence can be viewed as simple "scaling" relationships between caterpillars and food sources evolved to increase the benefits of individual foraging in later stages.

=== Silk production ===
Large silk trails help increase adhesion to the host plant. As caterpillars advance in groups, they form thick mats of silk that provide them with secure adhesion. Isolated caterpillars have been observed to fall off their host trees and perish. It has been hypothesized that this is due to the production of thin strands that do not provide a secure grip or due to a faster exhaustion of silk supply. In addition to this, making silk is more costly for larvae in their first instars, so grouping is beneficial in earlier stages. As caterpillars develop, they decrease the use of shared silk.

=== Mating ===
The first adults to eclose (emerge from their pupa) in early spring are the males. Starting at around 5:30 p.m., hundreds of males fly vigorously and relentlessly in search for cocoons containing females about to eclose. They approach trees and move around them, zigzagging and crawling on branches. If they do not find females with whom they will have the chance to copulate, they fly off and continue their search. It has been suggested that male activity is dependent on temperature, since below 59 ˚F (15 ˚C) only a small number of males are found to be actively looking for females. It has also been reported that females emit a calling pheromone before they emerge from the pupae, causing an increase in male activity around the cocoon before they eclose. In addition, males have been seen approaching and moving around brown objects, suggesting that males also use visual cues to find females. Within one or two seconds after the tip of the female abdomen clears the cocoon, males begin copulation, which lasts an average of 202 minutes. In order to position himself, the male moves backwards and bends his abdomen towards the female, pushing the tip towards the female's bursa copulatrix. There is a significant positive correlation between the body sizes of copulating pairs, which indicates that mating is not random with respect to size, presumably because of male-male competition for larger females. Independently of whether they are or not copulating, females do not move more than a few centimeters from their eclosion site until they are able to fly away, usually at twilight. Females start preparing for flight by fanning their wings. Frequently, fanning begins during mating and is often the first sign of its end as females fly away soon after.

==== Influence of population density on mating behavior ====
Forest tent caterpillar populations increase periodically to outbreak densities. Not much is known about the factors that lead to the initiation of forest tent caterpillar outbreaks, although some plausible mechanisms are higher temperatures in the spring, phenological synchrony with their host plants, and reduced predation enemies. Whatever the cause, outbreak densities give rise to cyclic population dynamics, characterized by highest fecundity at peak population density and reduced fecundity for several generations during decline. At low population densities, moths are found mating high above the ground, in the forest canopy. Mating starts late in the day and copulations are short. In contrast, during high-density outbreaks, mating takes place on lower vegetation, presumably because caterpillars descend to forage in less defoliated areas, where they form their pupae. This high population density increases the operational sex ratio and significantly intensifies male-male competition. As a result, copulations begin earlier in the day and last longer in an attempt to minimize sperm competition. In addition, such high densities enhance female opportunities for being selective regarding males.

During high outbreak densities, some males, called "hangers", change their copulation behavior. They do not attach physically to the branch while mating, which allows them to mate longer and counteract their mate's efforts to reject them. This behavior increases the percentage of eggs they fertilize as they delay their mated female from remating and reduce number of potential mates the female can have. This hanging behavior does not appear at low population densities, presumably because it is more energetically costly and more conspicuous, since it can attract more males that can potentially interfere in the copulation process. As a result, males only exhibit this behavior when they are trying to prolong mating to reduce sperm competition.

==== Oviposition ====
Females begin ovipositing the day after copulation and do so in one batch during a single oviposition event. Shorter and longer oviposition durations are associated with smaller and larger egg masses, which are directly related to female size. Just before beginning to oviposit, females exhibit dispersal behavior. They position themselves on a branch, spread their wings, and extend their abdominal tip around the branch to prepare for oviposition. As they oviposit, they move around the branch aligning the eggs, forming a ring-like structure around the branch. They then cover their eggs with a foamy substance known as spumaline. It has been hypothesized that the spumaline cover protects eggs from predation and parasitism. Offspring pass the winter inside their eggs. Although cold tolerant, they are susceptible to freezing in extreme cold temperatures, with the risk of mortality varying seasonally with changes in temperature and physiology. Not much is known about parental effects on offspring survival during the winter. The only source of energy for overwintering forest tent caterpillar eggs comes from the parental generation. As a result, overwintering performance of the insect should be viewed in the context of parental fitness.

=== Predation ===
Individual risk is lower in larger groups due to collective defense from predators, the dilution effect, and the selfish herd theory. All of these effects provide supplementary protection to individuals in the middle of the group. To compensate for group conspicuousness, caterpillars minimize movement, reducing their chances of being located by invertebrate predators. This behavior has associated costs because it decreases individual caterpillars’ selectiveness regarding food sources, as they will not be able to work to get better food sources. Caterpillar grouping behaviors change depending on food source; on less favorable food sources, caterpillar groups tend to splinter, thereby potentially increasing the risk for predation. Ontogenetic changes in caterpillars reduce the risk of predation and as a consequence, predation-related benefits of group foraging decrease with time. Moreover, grouping in later instars has the extra cost of an increased risk of pathogen transmission.

The entomophthoralean fungus Furia gastropachae (Racib.) S. Keller has long been associated with Forest tent caterpillar population decline in North American forests, including Florida, Maryland and New York (state). Furia crustosa is now classed as a synonym of Furia gastropachae. The species of fungus rarely infects species outside the genus Malacosoma. In 2002, Resting spores were observed even within the cadavers infected by other resting spores, a phenomenon not previously observed among the Entomophthorales. This allows the fungus to initiate cycles of secondary infection via conidia'. Also, host infection by resting spores was highest at intermediate levels of soil moisture. Infection of fourth instar larvae by resting spores and conidia was maximized at cooler temperatures (of 10 to 20 °C).

== Outbreaks ==
The caterpillars are considered a problem when the larva population explodes in the spring. They can completely consume the foliage of a tree. Trees usually recover from this, refoliating within a month and resuming photosynthesis. Under most circumstances, little lasting damage is caused to the trees; however, the disappearance of foliage is considered to be an unattractive nuisance. On those rare occasions when infestations last for three years or more, tree mortality rates can become significant. Multiple outbreaks in Northern Ontario, Canada, in the 1990s resulted in over six consecutive years of aspen defoliation in some areas. One outbreak in upstate New York and Vermont began in 2002, with 650,000 acres (2600 km²) defoliated in New York and 230,000 acres (930 km²) in Vermont by 2005.

The cause of the outbreak cycle is not known with certainty. There are a large number of natural mortality agents which could be responsible for population cycling, including parasitoids, predators, starvation, disease, and severe weather; however these "cycles" vary tremendously and unpredictably in intensity. Most infestations subside after one or two years as a result of a combination of these factors. The most common parasitoids associated with population decline are flies of the families Tachinidae and Sarcophagidae.

Forest tent caterpillar outbreaks in Canada generally tend to recur every decade or so, but with the precise interval varying significantly at finer spatial scales. Outbreaks usually last two to four years, but are often as brief as a single year. Although the insect's distributional range is quite large, the area over which decadal outbreak cycles are synchronized (i.e. oscillating with the same phase) varies substantially. Outbreak cycles are more strongly periodic and synchronized in eastern Canada than in western Canada. Where spatially separated populations are phase-synchronized, the synchronization may be due to the process of entrainment, as conjectured by Moran's theorem. However, it has been argued on one occasion that extensive outbreaks are the result of a positive feedback loop on population growth rates - a nonlinear dynamic that is more consistent with catastrophe theory.
