= Katherine Pollard =

American biotechnologist

Katie Pollard
- Born: Katherine Snowden Pollard
- Education: Pomona College (BA); University of California, Berkeley (MS, PhD)
- Awards: ISCB Fellow (2020); CZ Biohub Investigator (2017-present)
- Scientific career
- Fields: Evolutionary genomics Functional genomics
- Workplaces: Gladstone Institutes; University of California, San Francisco; University of California, Davis; University of California, Santa Cruz
- Thesis: Computationally intensive statistical methods for analysis of gene expression data (2003)
- Doctoral advisor: Mark van der Laan
- Notable students: Samantha Riesenfeld; Tony Capra
- Website: gladstone.org/people/katherine-pollard

Katherine Snowden Pollard is the Director of the Gladstone Institute of Data Science and Biotechnology and a professor at the University of California, San Francisco (UCSF). She is a Chan Zuckerberg Biohub Investigator. She was awarded Fellowship of the International Society for Computational Biology in 2020 and the American Institute for Medical and Biological Engineering in 2021 for outstanding contributions to computational biology and bioinformatics.

== Education ==
Pollard received a B.A. summa cum laude in anthropology and mathematics from Pomona College and an M.S. from the University of California, Berkeley (UC Berkeley). She was awarded a Ph.D. in 2003 from UC Berkeley for research supervised by Mark van der Laan.

== Career and research ==
Pollard is a leader in developing statistical models and open-source software for big data, particularly in genomics. She and her team pioneered the identification of the fastest-evolving regions of the human genome, known as human accelerated regions (HARs). Pollard has also designed methods to study the human microbiome and other microbial communities, setting the stage for the use of metagenomics in precision medicine.

Before joining UCSF, she held a postdoctoral research position with Sandrine Dudoit at UC Berkeley and worked with David Haussler at UC Santa Cruz.

== Honors and awards ==
- Fellow, American Association for the Advancement of Science. 2023.
- Member, National Academy of Medicine
- Fellow, American Institute for Medical and Biological Engineering. 2021.
- Fellow, International Society for Computational Biology. 2020.
- Gladstone Institutes Mentoring Award. 2019.
- Women Who Lead in the Life Sciences. SF Business Times. 2018.
- 75 Most Influential Alumni, UC Berkeley School of Public Health. 2018.
- Chan Zuckerberg Biohub Investigator. 2017–present.
- Fellow, California Academy of Sciences. 2013–present.
- Breakthrough Biomedical Research Award, UCSF. 2009–2010.
- Sloan Research Fellowship, Alfred P. Sloan Foundation. 2008–2010.
- NIH Postdoctoral Fellowship, NIGMS/NIH NRSA. 2003–2005.
- Evelyn Fix Prize, Chin Long Chiang Biostatistics Student of the Year, UC Berkeley. 2003.
- Valedictorian, High Scholarship Prize, Math Prize, Anthropology Prize, Phi Beta Kappa Award, Pomona College. 1995.
- Sophomore Math Prize, Pomona College. 1993.
