= Chang Shih-Hsun =

Chinese functional analyst (1900–1985)

- Born: 16 November 1900; Langzhong, Sichuan, Qing China
- Died: 10 September 1985 (aged 84); Chengdu, Sichuan, China

Academic background
- Doctoral advisor: Frank Smithies

Academic work
- Discipline: Mathematics
- Sub-discipline: Integral equations Functional analysis

Chinese name
- Simplified Chinese: 张鼎铭
- Traditional Chinese: 張鼎銘
Transcriptions
Standard Mandarin
- Hanyu Pinyin: zhāng dǐng míng
- Gwoyeu Romatzyh: Chang Shih-Hsun
- Wade–Giles: Zhang^{1} Ding^{3}-Ming^{2}
- IPA: [ʈʂáŋ tìŋmǐŋ]

Chang Shih-Hsun or Zhang Shixun (Chinese: 张世勋; pinyin: Zhāng Shìxūn; Wade–Giles: Chang Shih-Hsun; November 16, 1900 - September 10, 1985) was a Chinese mathematician. He was also known by his courtesy name Dingming (Chinese: 张鼎铭), later used as his pseudonym. He was born in Hexi Township, Langzhong, Sichuan, China.

He was a modern Chinese mathematician who earned his PhD in mathematics from the University of Cambridge in the United Kingdom. He was a researcher at Institute for Advanced Study in Princeton, New Jersey in the US. He served as a professor at institutions such as Beijing Normal University, Northwest United University, Northwest Normal University, and Sichuan University.

== Early life and education ==
Chang Shih-Hsun was born on November 16, 1900, in Langzhong, Sichuan Province. Due to poverty, he did not start primary school until 1908 for his enlightenment education, and then went to Nanchong for high school in 1915, where he was taught by Zhang Lan, a modern Chinese educator.

In 1921, he was admitted to the Department of Mathematics and Physics of the Beijing Advanced Normal School (the predecessor of Beijing Normal University), and graduated from the Department of Mathematical Research of Beijing Normal University in 1927. In the same year, he went to the College of Science and Technology of Northeastern University in Shenyang to serve as an acting professor.

In 1930, Zhang Lan hired him to return to Sichuan to teach at Chengdu University (one of the predecessors of Sichuan University). During his time at Chengdu University until 1936, he was one of the main professors in sciences. In 1936, he and Jiang Chaoxi were both appointed as verified professors by the Ministry of Education. After the outbreak of the Anti-Japanese War, Chang Shih-Hsun went to the Faculty of Science at Northwest University in Shaanxi Chenggu in 1939. In 1941, the original Northern Normal University separated from the Northwest United University and was renamed the Northwest Normal College, and Chang Shih-Hsun once again applied to teach there. In 1942, the teachers and students of the Northwest Teachers College gradually moved to Lanzhou. After sending off all his graduating students, Chang Shih-Hsun then went to Lanzhou to teach in 1944.

== Study abroad and return ==
In 1945, after the victory of the Anti-Japanese War, Chang Shih-Hsun was recommended by the Northwest Teachers College and sent by the Ministry of Education to further his studies at the University of Cambridge in England. His mentor at Cambridge was integral equation and mathematics history expert Frank Smithies. Two years later, Chang Shih-Hsun received his Ph.D.

At the end of 1948, Chang Shih-Hsun accepted an invitation from the Institute for Advanced Study in Princeton, New Jersey, United States, to conduct research. There he met Hermann Weyl, Shiing-Shen Chern, and Hua Luogeng.

In the summer of June 1949, he returned to China. Recommended by his friend Professor Zhao Song of the Mathematics Department of Sichuan University, he returned to teach at Sichuan University at the end of that year.

From 1927 when he was acting as a professor, until his death in Chengdu in 1985, Chang Shih-Hsun spent 58 years teaching at universities. In addition, if one year in 1919 teaching at a primary school in his hometown and one year in 1926 teaching at a high school in Beijing were also accounted for, he would have accumulated a total of 60 years of teaching experiences. He taught many advanced courses in different subjects, such as calculus, advanced calculus, integral equations, group theory, number theory, modern algebra, analytic number theory, algebraic number theory, variational calculus, complex variable function theory, real variable function theory, advanced geometry, non-Euclidean geometry, differential geometry, set theory, Lebesgue integration, Fourier series, abstract integral calculus, and functional analysis.

== Academic achievements ==
Chang Shih-Hsun specialised in integral equations and functional analysis. As early as the 1930s, considering that there were few people studying integral equations in China, he compiled a book called "Theory of Integral Equations" (1936) in his spare teaching time, which was the first monograph on integral equations in China. During the Second Sino-Japanese War, his life was turbulent and chaotic. When he arrived at Cambridge University in early 1946 he had the opportunity to focus on frontier research, and achieved significant results in linear integral equations in two years. He found the relationship between the eigenvalues and singular values of integral equations, solving a longstanding unsolved problem in the international mathematics community.

In 1948, under the guidance of Frank Smithies, he wrote On the distribution of the characteristic values and singular values of linear integral equations. He changed the previous method of studying characteristic values and singular values separately, connecting the two for joint research and obtaining significant results that characterize the relationship between them. After the paper was published in the American Mathematical Society Journal in 1949, it attracted widespread attention and was regarded as a foundational work in the theory of linear characteristic values.

Chang Shih-Hsun has published more than 20 mathematical papers in academic journals both at home and abroad, such as the "Journal of the London Mathematical Society", "Proceedings of the American Mathematical Society", "Science in China", "Acta Mathematica Sinica", and "Journal of Sichuan University", particularly in the 1940s and 1950s.

In 1949, in his doctoral thesis, he used the determinant method to obtain the best eigenvalue type of O < T ≤ 2, solving the problem of the relationship between eigenvalues and singular values of linear integral equations. This achievement had a significant impact on subsequent research.

In 1952, he provided an estimate of the magnitude of the L2 kernel singular values.

In 1947, he extended Lalesco's conclusion on kernel factorization to L2 kernels, and discussed the sufficient and necessary conditions for a normative decomposition of an L2 kernel with n factors.

In 1951, he expanded the Bernstein theorem; and from this, the properties of the coefficients of the Fredholm determinant of linear integral equations were derived.

In 1954, he obtained the sufficient and necessary conditions for the L2 kernel to be a normal kernel, and obtained the expansion formula of the normal kernel and the expression of the solution of its integral equation.

In 1957, he generalized Bunyakovsky's inequality and used it to obtain the expansion formula of the L2 kernel. He also extended the Hilbert-Schmidt expansion theorem and obtained an interesting inequality.
