= Sündüz Keleş =

Turkish statistician

Sündüz Keleş is a Turkish-American statistician specializing in statistical methods in genomics. She is a professor of statistics and of biostatistics and medical informatics at the University of Wisconsin–Madison. Her research has included the development of the FreeHi-C system for generating synthetic Hi-C (all-versus-all chromosome conformation capture) data.

Keleş studied industrial engineering at Bilkent University, but became interested in statistics after working there on a project involving survival analysis. She then moved to the University of California, Berkeley for graduate study, working with Mark van der Laan on biostatistics. She completed her Ph.D. there in 2003, and took her faculty position at Wisconsin after completing her doctorate, with a delay of a year to do postdoctoral research on microarray analysis techniques with van der Laan and Sandrine Dudoit.

Keleş was elected as a Fellow of the American Statistical Association in 2023.
