= Louise M. Ryan =

Australian biostatistician

Louise Marie Ryan AO FAA is an Australian biostatistician. She is a professor of statistics in the School of Mathematical Sciences at the University of Technology Sydney, president-elect of the International Biometric Society, and an editor-in-chief of the journal Statistics in Medicine. She is known for her work applying statistics to cancer and risk assessment in environmental health.

== Education and career ==
Ryan graduated in 1978 from Macquarie University, beginning her studies in actuarial science but shifting to statistics under the mentorship of Don McNeil. She completed her PhD in 1983 from Harvard University. Her dissertation, The Weighted Normal Plot II: Efficiency of Tests for Carcinogenicity, was supervised by Arthur P. Dempster.

She remained at Harvard as a postdoctoral researcher and faculty member. At Harvard, she became the Henry Pickering Walcott Professor of Biostatistics, and chaired the biostatistics department. In 2009, she returned to Australia as Chief of the Division of Mathematics, Informatics and Statistics at CSIRO. In 2012, she moved again, to the University of Technology Sydney.

== Awards and honours ==
Ryan became a fellow of the American Statistical Association in 1993. She is also an elected member of the International Statistical Institute, and was elected to the Institute of Medicine in 2008. In 2012 she became a fellow of the Australian Academy of Science for "developing and applying statistical methods to diverse areas of public interest, including financial risk, climate change and cancer". In 2015 she received the 2015 Centennial Medal from Harvard University, which is an honour given by Harvard’s Graduate School of Arts and Sciences to recipients of graduate degrees from the School for their contributions to society. Other notable figures to receive the prestigious award include authors Margaret Atwood (1990) and Susan Sontag (1991). In 2018 she was awarded the Pitman Medal for outstanding achievement in statistics by the Statistical Society of Australia.

Ryan was appointed an Officer of the Order of Australia in the 2024 Australia Day Honours for "distinguished service to biostatistical research and methodology, to environmental science, and to professional societies".
