= Aurore Delaigle =

Belgian-Australian statistician & scholar

Aurore Delaigle FAA is a Professor and ARC Future Fellow in the Department of Mathematics and Statistics at the University of Melbourne, Australia. Her research interests include nonparametric statistics, deconvolution and functional data analysis.

== Education and career ==
Following her undergraduate degree in mathematics at Université catholique de Louvain, Belgium, she completed a PhD in statistics at the same institution on kernel estimation in deconvolution problems. In her early career, she undertook a postdoctoral fellowship at University of California, Davis, before joining University of California, San Diego as an assistant professor. She was also a Reader at the University of Bristol.

In 2014, she was promoted to Professor at the University of Melbourne.

== Awards and fellowships ==
While at UC San Diego, she was awarded a Hellman Fellowship (2006–07).

In 2013, she was awarded the Moran Medal from the Australian Academy of Science, for her contribution to "contemporary statistical problems". In 2017, Delaigle was awarded the George W. Snedecor Award by the Committee of Presidents of Statistical Societies.

From 2013 to 2018, she is an ARC Future Fellow, investigating new nonparametric statistical methods.

She is a Fellow of the Institute of Mathematical Statistics for her work in "non-parametric function estimation, measurement error problems, and functional data". She is also an elected member of the International Statistical Institute. In 2018 she became a Fellow of the American Statistical Association and in May 2020 she was elected Fellow of the Australian Academy of Science.
