= Edward Hannan =

Edward Hannan may refer to:

- Edward J. Hannan (1921–1994), Australian statistician
- Edward Joseph Hannan (1836–1891), Irish-born priest, founder of Hibernian Football Club in Edinburgh
