= Edward Norman Dancer =

Australian mathematician

Edward Norman Dancer FAA (born 29 December 1946, Bundaberg, Queensland, Australia) is an Australian mathematician, specializing in nonlinear analysis.

Dancer received in 1969 a Bachelor of Science with Honours (BSc (Hons)) from the Australian National University and in 1972 a PhD from the University of Cambridge with thesis advisor Frank Smithies and thesis Bifurcation in Banach Spaces. As a postdoc Dancer was from 1971 to 1972 at the University of Newcastle-upon-Tyne, UK and from 1972 to 1973 at the Institute of Advanced Studies at the Australian National University. At the University of New England in New South Wales, he was from 1973 to 1975 a lecturer, from 1976 to 1981 a senior lecturer, from 1981 to 1987 an associate professor, and from 1987 to 1993 a full professor. From 1993 to the present, he has been a full professor and chair of the school of mathematics and statistics at the University of Sydney.

His present research interests include nonlinear analysis, especially degree theory, Morse theory and Conley index; applications to nonlinear ordinary and partial differential equations, including singular perturbations; bifurcation theory.

Dancer is also a part time professor at Swansea University.

== Honours and awards ==
- 1996 — elected a Fellow of the Australian Academy of Science (FAA)
- 2002 — Humboldt Research Award received from the Humboldt Foundation and Helmholtz Association
- 2009 — Hannan Medal awarded by the Australian Academy of Science
- 2010 — Invited Speaker at the International Congress of Mathematicians in Hyderabad
- 2017 — Schauder Medal

== Selected publications ==
- Dancer, E. N. (1973). "Global solution branches for positive mappings". Archive for Rational Mechanics and Analysis. 52 (2): 181–192. Bibcode:1973ArRMA..52..181D. doi:10.1007/BF00282326. S2CID 122278304.
- with Ralph S. Phillips: Dancer, E. N.; Phillips, Ralph (1974). "On the structure of solutions of non-linear eigenvalue problems". Indiana University Mathematics Journal. 23 (11): 1069–1076. doi:10.1512/iumj.1974.23.23087. JSTOR 24890776.
- Dancer, E. N. (1977). "On the Dirichlet problem for weakly non-linear elliptic partial differential equations". Proceedings of the Royal Society of Edinburgh, Section A. 76 (4): 283–300. doi:10.1017/S0308210500019648. S2CID 123218340.
- Dancer, E.N. (1983). "On the indices of fixed points of mappings in cones and applications". Journal of Mathematical Analysis and Applications. 91 (1): 131–151. doi:10.1016/0022-247X(83)90098-7.
- Dancer, E.N (1985). "On positive solutions of some pairs of differential equations, II" (PDF). Journal of Differential Equations. 60 (2): 236–258. Bibcode:1985JDE....60..236D. doi:10.1016/0022-0396(85)90115-9.
- Dancer, E.N (1990). "The effect of domain shape on the number of positive solutions of certain nonlinear equations, II". Journal of Differential Equations. 87 (2): 316–339. Bibcode:1990JDE....87..316D. doi:10.1016/0022-0396(90)90005-A.
- Dancer, E. N. (1991). "On the existence and uniqueness of positive solutions for competing species models with diffusion". Trans. Amer. Math. Soc. 326 (2): 829–859. doi:10.1090/S0002-9947-1991-1028757-9.
- with Peter Hess: "Stability of fixed points for order-preserving discrete-time dynamical systems". J. Reine Angew. Math. 1991 (419): 125–139. 1991. doi:10.1515/crll.1991.419.125. S2CID 120712971.
- Dancer, E.N. (1992). "Some notes on the method of moving planes". Bulletin of the Australian Mathematical Society. 46 (3): 425–434. doi:10.1017/S0004972700012089.
- Dancer, E. N. (1998). "Some remarks on a boundedness assumption for monotone dynamical systems" (PDF). Proc. Amer. Math. Soc. 126 (3): 801–807. doi:10.1090/S0002-9939-98-04276-2.
- with Shusen Yan: "Multipeak solutions for a singularly perturbed Neumann problem". Pacific Journal of Mathematics. 182 (2): 241–262. 1999.
- with Yihong Du: Dancer, E. N.; Du, Yihong (2003). "Some remarks on Liouville type results for quasilinear elliptic equations" (PDF). Proc. Amer. Math. Soc. 131 (6): 1891–1899. doi:10.1090/S0002-9939-02-06733-3.
- with Juncheng Wei and Tobias Weth: Dancer, E.N.; Wei, Juncheng; Weth, Tobias (2010). "A priori bounds versus multiple existence of positive solutions for a nonlinear Schrödinger system". Annales de l'Institut Henri Poincaré C. 27 (3): 953–969. Bibcode:2010AIHPC..27..953D. doi:10.1016/j.anihpc.2010.01.009.
- with Kelei Wang and Zhitao Zhang: Dancer, E. N.; Wang, Kelei; Zhang, Zhitao (2012). "Dynamics of strongly competing systems with many species". Trans. Amer. Math. Soc. 364 (2): 961–1005. doi:10.1090/S0002-9947-2011-05488-7.
