= Douglas Northcott =

British mathematician

Douglas Geoffrey Northcott
- Born: Douglas Geoffrey Robertson; 31 December 1916; Kensington, London, England
- Died: 8 April 2005 (aged 88); Sheffield, Yorkshire, England
- Education: University of Cambridge
- Known for: Ideal theory
- Spouse: Rose Hilda Austin (m. 1949; died 1992)
- Scientific career
- Workplaces: University of Cambridge; University of Sheffield
- Thesis: Tauberian theorems for functions taking values in Banach spaces (1949)
- Doctoral advisor: Frank Smithies

Douglas Geoffrey Northcott, FRS (31 December 1916 – 8 April 2005) was a British mathematician who worked on ideal theory.

== Early life and career ==
Northcott was born Douglas Geoffrey Robertson in Kensington on 31 December 1916 to Clara Freda (née Behl) (1894–1958) and her first husband Geoffrey Douglas Spence Robertson (1894–1978). His mother remarried in 1919 to Arthur Hugh Kynaston Northcott (1887–1952). In 1935, he legally adopted his step-father's surname.

He was educated in London, then at Christ's Hospital and St John's College, Cambridge, where he started research under the supervision of G.H. Hardy.

His work was interrupted by active service during World War II. Captured at Singapore, he survived his time as a prisoner of war in Japan, and returned to Cambridge at the end of the war.

Back at Cambridge, he published his dissertation "Abstract Tauberian theorems with applications to power series and Hilbert series ". He then turned to algebra under the influence of Emil Artin, whom he had met while visiting Princeton University. He became a Research Fellow of St John's College in 1948.

In 1949, he proved an important result in the theory of heights, namely that there are only finitely many algebraic numbers of bounded degree and bounded height. In analogy to this result, a set of algebraic numbers is said to satisfy the Northcott property if there are only finitely many elements of bounded height.

In 1952, he moved to the Town Trust Chair of Pure Mathematics at Sheffield University. He remained at Sheffield until his retirement in 1982, also serving as Head of Department and Dean of Pure Science.

In 1954, Douglas Northcott and David Rees introduced in a joint paper the Northcott-Rees theory of reductions and integral closures, which has subsequently been influential in commutative algebra.

== Awards ==
Northcott was awarded the London Mathematical Society Junior Berwick Prize in 1953 and served as LMS Vice-President during 1968-69. He was elected Fellow of the Royal Society in 1961.

== Family life ==
In 1949, at Cambridge, Northcott married Rose Hilda Austin (1917-1992), with two daughters, Anne Patricia (born 1950) and Pamela Rose (1952-1992).

== Publications ==
- Northcott, D. G. Multilinear algebra. Cambridge University Press, Cambridge, 1984. ISBN 0-521-26269-0
- Northcott, D. G. A first course of homological algebra. Reprint of 1973 edition. Cambridge University Press, Cambridge-New York, 1980. ISBN 0-521-29976-4
- Northcott, D. G. Affine sets and affine groups. London Mathematical Society Lecture Note Series, 39. Cambridge University Press, Cambridge-New York, 1980. ISBN 0-521-22909-X
- Northcott, D. G. Finite free resolutions. Cambridge Tracts in Mathematics, No. 71. Cambridge University Press, Cambridge-New York-Melbourne, 1976.
- Northcott, D. G. Lessons on rings, modules and multiplicities. Cambridge University Press, London 1968
- Northcott, D. G. An introduction to homological algebra. Cambridge University Press, New York 1960
- Northcott, D. G. Ideal theory. Cambridge Tracts in Mathematics and Mathematical Physics, No. 42. Cambridge, at the University Press, 1953.
