= Jean Maud Bullen =

New Zealand-born geophysicist

Jean Bullen
- Born: 1918
- Died: 2002 (aged 83–84)
- Known for: Pioneer woman in Geoscience in New Zealand
- Scientific career
- Fields: Geophysics

Jean Maud Bullen (1918–2002) was a New Zealand-born geophysicist, regarded as one of Australasia's first women pioneers in geoscience. She was the sister of Keith Edward Bullen.

== Career ==
Bullen was a scholarship winner for the Junior New Zealand Test , and she worked first as a secondary school teacher. During WW2, she worked for the geological Survey of New Zealand, and researched groundwater information of New Zealand using magnetometers. She was then a foundation member of the Geophysics Division, of the geological Survey of New Zealand.

Until she retired, Bullen worked for the Ionosphere Section of the Department of Scientific and Industrial Research in Christchurch, New Zealand. She spent considerable time preparing instrumentation for upper atmosphere observations, but she never visited the Scott Base.

== Selected work ==
- Bullen, J. M. (1961). An analysis of estimated values of maximum usable frequency throughout a sunspot cycle and associated electron density trends, at Christchurch, New Zealand. New Zealand Journal of Geology and Geophysics, 4(4), 331-346.
- Bullen, J. M. (1961). Atmospheric scale height as a modifying influence on linear trend of F-region electron density with sunspot number. Nature, 192(4802), 542-543.
