= Noel Cressie =

Australian and American statistician

Noel Andrew Cressie
- Distinguished Professor Noel Cressie, image was taken in April 2025
- Born: Fremantle, Western Australia, Australia
- Education: University of Western Australia; Princeton University
- Scientific career
- Workplaces: Flinders University; Iowa State University; The Ohio State University; University of Wollongong
- Thesis: Testing for Uniformity against a Clustering Alternative
- Doctoral advisor: Geoffrey Watson
- Other academic advisors: John Tukey
- Doctoral students: Mathematics Genealogy Project
- Website: Noel Cressie Research Page

Noel Andrew Cressie FRSN FAA is an Australian and American statistician. He is Distinguished Professor and Director, Centre for Environmental Informatics, at the University of Wollongong in Wollongong (53 miles south of Sydney), Australia.

== Education and career ==
Cressie studied Mathematics at the University of Western Australia. In the USA, he was a Fulbright Scholar at Princeton University, where he obtained his Ph.D. in Statistics, advised by Geoffrey S. Watson and taught by both Watson and John W. Tukey. He has spent the majority of his professional life in the USA as professor and distinguished professor at both Iowa State University and The Ohio State University. Since 2012, Cressie has been professor and distinguished professor at the University of Wollongong, Australia, where he is also Director of the Centre of Environmental Informatics(CEI). More details on his career can be found in the 2019 article, “A Conversation with Noel Cressie”, where he discusses the evolution of statistical science in spatial and spatio-temporal statistics.

== Research ==
Cressie's research lies broadly in data science in the area of environmental informatics, emphasizing uncertainty quantification and using tools from the fields of Statistics, Mathematics, Computing, and Visualization. His main area of application in the 2010s and beyond has been in remote sensing of the environment, where he uses spatial and spatio-temporal statistical methodology.

Cressie is best known for having brought disparate statistical methodologies in the early 1990s into a nascent discipline known as Spatial Statistics. In his widely cited book, Statistics for Spatial Data, Cressie established a general spatial model that unified statistics for geostatistical data, regular and irregular lattice data, point patterns, and random sets, building on earlier research of his and many others on statistical theory, methodology, and applications for spatial data. Since the 2000s, this methodology has emphasized hierarchical statistical modeling, which was integrated into two subsequent books, Statistics for Spatio-Temporal Data and Spatio-Temporal Statistics with R. His work has been applied in areas of ‘big science,’ such as remote sensing of Earth on a global scale, understanding the global carbon cycle and its effect on climate change, Greenland ice-sheet mass balance, and disease mapping.

Over the course of his statistical career, Cressie has authored or coauthored four books and over 350 articles in scholarly journals, edited volumes, and popular publications. His first book, joint with Timothy R. C. Read, was published in 1988 and is titled Goodness-of-Fit Statistics for Discrete Multivariate Data. In 1991, the book Statistics for Spatial Data was published (with a revised edition in 1993). Cressie's next book, Statistics for Spatio-Temporal Data (2011), was written jointly with Christopher K. Wikle. The book received two awards: the 2011 PROSE Award in the Mathematics category (for PROfessional and Scholarly Excellence), given by the Association of American Publishers; and the 2013 DeGroot Book Prize awarded by the International Society for Bayesian Analysis. The fourth book, Spatio-Temporal Statistics with R (2019) by Christopher K. Wikle, Andrew Zammit-Mangion, and Cressie received the 2019 Taylor and Francis Award for Outstanding Reference/Monograph in the Science and Medical category.

== Honors and awards ==
Cressie's accomplishments have resulted in a number of awards, including Fellow of the American Statistical Association (ASA), Fellow of the Institute of Mathematical Statistics, Fellow of the Spatial Econometrics Association, and Elected Member of the International Statistical Institute. In 2009, Cressie received one of the highest awards in statistical science, the R.A. Fisher Lectureship from the Committee of Presidents of Statistical Societies (COPSS). In 2018, Cressie was elected a Fellow of the Australian Academy of Science (FAA), and in 2020 he was elected a Fellow of the Royal Society of New South Wales (FRSN).

He was awarded the Pitman Medal in 2014 by the Statistical Society of Australia in recognition of his outstanding achievement in, and contribution to the discipline of Statistics. In 2016, he received the Barnett Award from the Royal Statistical Society for excellence in environmental statistics, and in 2017 he received the Georges Matheron Award from the International Association for Mathematical Geosciences. Cressie was awarded the Hannan Medal by the Australian Academy of Science in 2025, and in 2026 he was awarded the Jerome Sacks Award from the National Institute of Statistical Sciences in the USA.

== Publications ==
- Read, Timothy R. C.; Cressie, Noel A. C. (1988). Goodness-of-Fit Statistics for Discrete Multivariate Data. New York, NY: Springer New York. doi:10.1007/978-1-4612-4578-0. ISBN 978-1-4612-8931-9.
- Cressie, Noel A. C. (10 September 1993). Statistics for Spatial Data. Wiley. doi:10.1002/9781119115151. ISBN 978-0-471-00255-0.
- Cressie, Noel A. C.; Wikle, Christopher K. (2011). Statistics for spatio-temporal data. Hoboken, N.J: Wiley. ISBN 978-0-471-69274-4.
- Wikle, Christopher K.; Zammit-Mangion, Andrew; Cressie, Noel (18 February 2019). Spatio-Temporal Statistics with R. Boca Raton, Florida: Chapman and Hall/CRC. doi:10.1201/9781351769723. ISBN 978-1-351-76972-3.
- Peer-reviewed, conference-proceedings, and popular-science articles by Cressie and co-authors can be found at his CEI Research Webpage, or at his UOW Scholars page: Dr Noel Cressie – University of Wollongong – UOW.
