= Edmund Alfred Cornish =

Australian mathematician (1909-1973)

Edmund Alfred Cornish DSc, FAA (7 January 1909 – 31 January 1973) was one of Australia's eminent mathematicians and statisticians. He was appointed an (inaugural) Foundation Fellow of the Australian Academy of Science (in 1954). He worked as the Officer-in-charge in Mathematical Statistics section of Commonwealth Scientific and Industrial Research Organisation in Adelaide from 1941. In 1954 he became the Chief of this division and served till his death in 1973.
