= Susan R. Wilson =

Australian statistician (1948–2020)

- Education: Australian National University (PhD)
- Scientific career
- Fields: Biostatistics Bioinformatics; Gene Expression; Applied Statistics; Population, Ecological And Evolutionary Genetics Epidemiology
- Workplaces: University of Sheffield; Australian National University; University of New South Wales
- Thesis: Some Statistical Results in Genetics (1972)
- Doctoral advisor: P.A.P. Moran

Susan Ruth Wilson (19 March 1948 – 16 March 2020) was an Australian statistician, known for her research in biostatistics and statistical genetics, and for her work on the understanding of AIDS in Australia. She edited the bulletin of the Institute of Mathematical Statistics from 1993 to 1998, and was president of the International Biometric Society from 1998 to 1999.

== Education and career ==
Wilson was born in Sydney. She earned her Ph.D. in 1972 from Australian National University; her dissertation, supervised by P. A. P. Moran, was Some Statistical Results in Genetics. She became a lecturer at the University of Sheffield, but in 1974 returned to Australia to take a position as research fellow at the Australian National University. She became a fellow there in 1976, and a senior fellow in 1984. In 1994, she was given a professorship in Statistical Science in the Centre for Mathematics and its Applications. At her death, she was a professor emeritus of bioinformation science and statistical science at Australian National University and also an honorary professor in the School of Mathematics and Statistics at the University of New South Wales.

== Recognition ==
She was elected as a member of the International Statistical Institute in 1979, as a fellow of the American Statistical Association in 1991, as a fellow of the Institute of Mathematical Statistics, and as an honorary life member of the International Biometric Society in 2012.
