= Adrian Baddeley =

Australian statistician (born 1955)

- Born: May 25, 1955 (age 70); Melbourne, Australia
- Education: Australian National University; University of Cambridge
- Awards: Pitman Medal (2004); Hannan Medal (2001); Fellow, Australian Academy of Science (elected 2000); Australian Mathematical Society Medal (1995)
- Scientific career
- Fields: Statistics
- Institutions: University of Bath; University of Western Australia; CSIRO; Curtin University
- Doctoral advisor: David George Kendall
- Website: oasisapps.curtin.edu.au/staff/profile/view/Adrian.Baddeley

Adrian John Baddeley (born May 25, 1955) is a statistical scientist working in the fields of spatial statistics, statistical computing, stereology and stochastic geometry.

== Life and career ==
Baddeley was born in Melbourne, Australia and educated at Eltham High School there, and studied mathematics and statistics at the Australian National University (honours supervisor: Roger Miles) and the University of Cambridge (PhD supervisor: David George Kendall). He was elected a Junior Research Fellow at Trinity College, Cambridge in the second year of his PhD. Subsequently, he worked for the University of Bath (1982–85), the CSIRO Division of Mathematics and Statistics, Sydney (1985–88), the Centrum Wiskunde & Informatica, Amsterdam, the Netherlands (1988–94), the University of Western Australia (where he was Professor of Statistics from 1994 to 2010), CSIRO Division of Mathematics, Informatics and Statistics, Perth (2010–2012), and the Centre for Exploration Targeting at the University of Western Australia (2013–2014). He is now Professor of Computational Statistics at Curtin University.

== Research ==
=== Stereology ===
Classical methods of stereology were limited by the requirement that the cutting plane be randomly oriented. Baddeley developed an alternative technique in which the cutting plane is "vertical" (parallel to a fixed axis, or perpendicular to a fixed surface) making it possible to apply quantitative microscopy to cylindrical core samples, samples of flat materials, and longitudinal sections.

Baddeley is a leading advocate of statistical ideas in stereology. With Cruz-Orive he demonstrated the role of the Horvitz-Thompson weighting principle and the Rao-Blackwell theorem in stereological sampling.

=== Spatial statistics ===
Baddeley is one of the world leading specialists in point pattern analysis, a connection of stochastics and geometry applied to the analysis of (mainly) 2D point distributions in Euclidean space. He has developed statistical methodologies for analyzing the structure of spatial patterns of points, including methods based on survival analysis, nonparametrics, new point process models, model-fitting principles (i.e. 'regression analysis' for point patterns) and algorithms and open-source software.

== Honours and awards ==
- John Curtin Distinguished Professor Award (2016)
- Georges Matheron Lecturer (2008)
- Pitman Medal (2004)
- Hannan Medal (2001)
- Centenary Medal (2001)
- Fellow, Australian Academy of Science (elected 2000)
- Australian Mathematical Society Medal (1995)
- Prize Research Fellowship, Trinity College, Cambridge (1979)
- Smith-Knight Prize, University of Cambridge (1979)
- University Medal, Australian National University (1976)
- Statistical Society of Australia Prize, Australian National University (1976)
- Hanna Neumann Prize for Pure Mathematics, Australian National University (1976 and 1975)
