= Mark van der Laan =

Dutch statistician

- Born: Mark Johannes van der Laan; 1967 (age 58–59); Netherlands
- Education: Utrecht University (PhD)
- Awards: COPSS Presidents' Award (2005)
- Scientific career
- Fields: Statistics; Biostatistics
- Workplaces: University of California, Berkeley
- Doctoral advisor: Richard D. Gill; Peter J. Bickel
- Doctoral students: Katherine Pollard; Sündüz Keleş
- Website: statistics.berkeley.edu/people/mark-van-der-laan

Mark Johannes van der Laan is the Jiann-Ping Hsu/Karl E. Peace Professor of Biostatistics and Statistics at the University of California, Berkeley. He has made contributions to survival analysis, semiparametric statistics, multiple testing, and causal inference. He also developed the targeted maximum likelihood estimation methodology. He is a founding editor of the Journal of Causal Inference.

== Education and career ==
Van der Laan received his MSc degree in mathematics in 1990 and his PhD in statistics in 1993, both from Utrecht University. Between 1988 and 1989, he studied as an exchange student at North Carolina State University. Van der Laan doctoral thesis, supervised by Richard D. Gill, was titled Efficient and Inefficient Estimation in Semiparametric Model. During his doctoral studies, Van der Laan conducted research at the Mathematical Sciences Research Institute at the University of California, Berkeley, where he was advised by Peter J. Bickel. Van der Laan became an assistant professor in biostatistics at Berkeley in 1994, and was promoted to associated professor in 1998, and to full professor in 2000. He became the Jiann-Ping Hsu/Karl E. Peace Endowed Chair in Biostatistics. Since 2016, Laan became the academic director of the Center of Targeted Learning in Precision Health at University of California, Berkeley.

== Honors and awards ==
He received the COPSS Presidents' Award in 2005, the Mortimer Spiegelman Award in 2004, and the van Dantzig Award in 2005.

=== Publications ===
- Van Der Laan, M.J.; Robins, J.M. (2003). Unified Methods for Censored Longitudinal Data and Causality. Springer Series in Statistics. Springer. ISBN 0-387-95556-9.
- Van Der Laan, M.J.; Rose, S. (2011). Targeted Learning: Causal Inference for Observational and Experimental Data. Springer Series in Statistics. Springer. ISBN 978-1-441-99781-4.
- Dudoit, S.; Van Der Laan, M.J. (2008). Multiple Testing Procedures with Applications to Genomics. Springer Series in Statistics. Springer. ISBN 978-0-387-49316-9.
