= Moran Medal =

Mathematical award

- Description: Award recognizing outstanding research by early-career Australian scientists in statistical sciences
- Country: Australia
- Presented by: Australian Academy of Science

The Moran Medal in Statistical Sciences is awarded every two years by the Australian Academy of Science to recognise outstanding research by Australian scientists under 40 years of age in the fields of applied probability, biometrics, mathematical genetics, psychometrics, and statistics.

This medal commemorates the work of the late Pat Moran, for his achievements in probability.

== Winners ==
Year	Winner	Affiliation	Location	Award field	Notes
2025	Margarita Moreno-Betancur	Murdoch Children's Research Institute and University of Melbourne		Biostatistics	
2023	David Frazier	Monash University		Statistics	
2023	Rachel Wang	University of Sydney		Statistics	
2021	Christopher Drovandi	Queensland University of Technology		Data collection and computation	
2021	Janice Scealy	Australian National University		Statistics	
2019	Kim-Anh Lê Cao and Stephen Leslie	University of Melbourne		Statistics	
2017	Joshua Ross	University of Adelaide		Applied Probability and Statistics	
2015	Jean Yang	University of Sydney		Statistical methodology	
2013	Aurore Delaigle	University of Melbourne		Statistics	
2011	Scott Sisson (statistician) and Mark Tanaka	University of New South Wales	Sydney	Statistics	
2009	Melanie Bahlo	Walter and Eliza Hall Institute	Melbourne	Statistics	
2007	Rob J. Hyndman	Monash University	Melbourne	Several areas of statistics	
2005	Mark W. Blows	University of Queensland	Brisbane	Mathematical genetics	
2003	Nigel G. Bean	University of Adelaide	Adelaide	Applied probability	
2001	Aihua Xia	University of Melbourne	Melbourne	Applied probability	
1997	Matthew P. Wand	University of Wollongong	Wollongong, NSW	Statistics	
1993	Philip K. Pollett	University of Queensland	Brisbane	Applied probability	
1990	Alan H. Welsh	Australian National University	Canberra		

== See also ==
- List of mathematics awards
