= Hannan Medal =

The Hannan Medal in the Mathematical Sciences is awarded every two years by the Australian Academy of Science to recognize achievements by Australians in the fields of pure mathematics, applied and computational mathematics, and statistical science.

This medal commemorates the work of the late Edward J. Hannan, FAA, for his achievements in time series analysis.

== Winners ==
Year	Winner	Affiliation	Location	Field	Notes
2025	Noel Cressie	University of Wollongong	Wollongong	Statistical science	
2023	Richard Hartley	Australian National University	Canberra	Computer vision (mathematics)	
2021	Mathai Varghese	University of Adelaide	Adelaide	Pure Mathematics	
2019	Alan Welsh	Australian National University	Canberra	Statistical science	
2017	Frank Robert De Hoog	CSIRO	Australia	Applied and computational mathematics	
2015	Alan McIntosh	Australian National University	Canberra	Pure Mathematics	
2015	Gus Lehrer	University of Sydney	Sydney	Pure Mathematics	
2013	Matthew Wand	University of Technology, Sydney	Sydney	Statistical science	
2011	Colin Rogers	University of New South Wales	Sydney	Applied and computational mathematics	
2009	E. Norman Dancer	University of Sydney	Sydney	Pure mathematics	
2007	Eugene Seneta	University of Sydney	Sydney	Statistical science	
2005	Richard P. Brent	Australian National University	Canberra	Applied and computational mathematics	
2003	J. Hyam Rubinstein	University of Melbourne	Melbourne	Pure mathematics	
2001	Adrian J. Baddeley	University of Western Australia	Perth	Statistical science	
1998	Anthony J. Guttmann	University of Melbourne	Melbourne	Applied and computational mathematics	
1996	Neil S. Trudinger	Australian National University	Canberra	Pure mathematics	
1994	Peter G. Hall	University of Melbourne	Melbourne	Statistical science	
1994	Christopher C. Heyde	Australian National University	Canberra	Statistical science	

== See also ==
- List of mathematics awards
