= David Forbes Martyn =

Australian scientist

- Born: 27 June 1906; Cambuslang, Scotland
- Died: 5 March 1970 (aged 63); Camden, New South Wales
- Awards: Thomas Ranken Lyle Medal (1947); Fellow of the Royal Society (1950); The Chree Medal and Prize (1955)
- Scientific career
- Institutions: Imperial College London

David Forbes Martyn FAA FRS (27 June 1906 – 5 March 1970) was a Scottish-born Australian physicist and radiographer.

== Education ==
Martyn was educated at Plymouth College and Allan Glen's School, a school in Glasgow noted for its commitment to the teaching of science. In 1923, he entered the Royal College of Science at Imperial College London. Martyn was awarded a Bachelor of Science degree in 1926; a PhD in 1929; and a Doctor of Science degree in 1936.

== Career ==
Martyn moved to Australia in 1927 to take up one of the first posts in radio research there. He contributed to the development of coastal and air defence RADAR for Australia during World War II. He was awarded the Thomas Ranken Lyle Medal of the Australian National Research Council in 1947 for his discovery of atmospheric tides, and received the T. K. Sidey Medal from the Royal Society of New Zealand in the same year, an award set up for outstanding scientific research. He was elected FRS of London in 1950.

Australia did not have a learned society for the whole of the Commonwealth of Australia equivalent to the (British) Royal Society - each of the states had its own. (For example, the Royal Society of New South Wales.) Martyn was one of the then 12 Fellows of the Royal Society resident in Australia, and it was largely through his patient negotiation that the various scientific bodies in Australia agreed that 11 of these 12 Fellows were independent enough to form a credible Australian Academy of Science (AAS), which they did in 1954. As well as being a Foundation Fellow of the AAS, he was elected its Secretary for Physical Sciences for 1954-5 and its president for 1969 until his death in 1970. He was inducted into the International Space Hall of Fame in 1980.

His tours, lectures, diplomacy and encouragement were strongly influential in establishing an effectively communicating Australian scientific community. His main interests were radiographic studies of the upper atmosphere and the sun, though his main contributions were theoretical. In 1959, Martyn delivered the first four of the annual series of ABC lectures (subsequently named the Boyer Lectures) on "Society in the Space Age".

== Personal ==
Martyn was born in Cambuslang, Scotland, the son of Harry Somerville Martyn, ophthalmic surgeon and Elizabeth Craig Allan, née Thom. He was a keen trout fisherman, which partly explains his growing interests in environmental matters. He married Margot Adams, from Sydney in 1944. They had no children. He died in Camden, New South Wales on 5 March 1970.
