= Jack Ellerton Becker =

Australian entrepreneur (1904–1979)

Sir Jack Ellerton Becker FAA (4 October 1904, in Unley, South Australia – 9 May 1979, in Pembroke, Bermuda), was a South Australian entrepreneur. In the 1920s and 1930s, he capitalised on the developing craze for music making his first fortune when he sold his highly successful Adelaide College of Music in 1942. In the 1940s and 1950s, land speculation in the Ninety Mile Desert and the area that became Elizabeth yielded two further fortunes.

Becker contracted to give £200,000 to the Australian Academy of Science over ten years when it was having financial problems in the early 1960s. Becker was appointed a fellow of the academy in 1961. He received a knighthood in the Queen's New Years Honours of 1962. In 1971, Becker and his wife retired to Pembroke, Bermuda. He died on 9 May 1979, and the academy was bequeathed an additional $3 million in his will. The academy's Canberra headquarters was for a time named Becker House in his honour.

In contrast to Howell's rather jaded and matter-of-fact 1993 biography in the Australian Dictionary of Biography, Rogers 1982 biography in Historical Records of Australian Science paints a much brighter picture of Becker's abilities and "benevolence".
