= Eugene Seneta =

Australian statistician

Eugene Seneta (born 1941) is Professor Emeritus, School of Mathematics and Statistics, University of Sydney, known for his work in probability and non-negative matrices, applications and history. (Dr. Eugene B. Seneta is the son of Professor Seneta). He is known for the variance gamma model in financial mathematics (the variance gamma process). He was Professor, School of Mathematics and Statistics at the University of Sydney from 1979 until retirement, and an Elected Fellow since 1985 of the Australian Academy of Science. In 2007 Seneta was awarded the Hannan Medal in Statistical Science by the Australian Academy of Science, for his seminal work in probability and statistics; for his work connected with branching processes, history of probability and statistics, and many other areas.
