= Keith Bullen (mathematician) =

Australian mathematician and geophysicist

Keith Edward Bullen FAA FRS (29 June 1906 – 23 September 1976) was a New Zealand-born mathematician and geophysicist. He is noted for his seismological interpretation of the deep structure of the Earth's mantle and core. He was Professor of Applied Mathematics at the University of Sydney in Australia from 1945 until 1971.

== Career ==
Bullen went to St John's College, Cambridge in 1931, and became a research student, with Harold Jeffreys as his supervisor. Jeffreys was working on the revision of the travel time of the seismic waves from earthquakes and Bullen worked with Jeffreys on this project throughout his years in Cambridge. Jeffreys remarks of this period that 'Bullen's energy was phenomenal'.

Bullen wrote prolifically. There are 290 papers in his list of publications. The topics are diverse; as well as the many research papers, there are scientific biographies, articles in encyclopaedias and dictionaries of science, and articles on education, especially mathematical education.

His first book, Introduction to the Theory of Seismology, was published by the Cambridge University Press in 1947 and has been a standard text for seismology ever since. The third edition was published in 1975 and Turkish, Chinese, and Russian translations were published in 1960, 1965, and 1965 respectively. Two other books closely related to his teaching at Sydney, Introduction to the Theory of Dynamics and Introduction to the Theory of Mechanics were published in 1948 and 1949. An eighth edition of the latter was published in 1971. His short monograph, Seismology, was published by Methuen in 1954. The International Institute of Seismology and Earthquake Engineering published his notes for a lecture course on theoretical seismology in 1972. His last book, The Earth's Density, was published in 1975; it covers a wider range of geophysics than its title would suggest because the problem of the Earth's density distribution is so intimately related to seismological information on the interior of the Earth.

Despite being deaf, Bullen played a very considerable role in international geophysics. He served as president of the International Association of Seismology and Physics of the Earth's Interior, as vice-president of the International Union of Geodesy and Geophysics, and as vice-president of the International Scientific Committee for Antarctic Research, and on a number of committees concerned with seismology and geophysics.

In Australian geophysics too he played a significant role, serving for five years as chairman of the Australian National Committee for the International Geophysical Year and also for five years as chairman of the Australian National Committee for Antarctic Research.

Bullen's energy was, as Jeffreys remarked, phenomenal. This was true not only of his vocation, science, but also of his avocations. He was indefatigable as a tourist in his earlier days and later as a coin collector. After long days at scientific meetings, or on committees, he would spend many hours seeking out coin shops or other coin collectors.

== Honours ==
Bullen was awarded many medals and honours by societies in Australia and abroad, being elected a fellow of the Royal Society of London in 1949, a foreign associate of the US National Academy of Sciences in 1961, and Member of the Pontifical Academy of Sciences in 1968. He was a foundation fellow of the Australian Academy of Science (1954), a member of the Council of the Academy 1955–57, and Matthew Flinders Lecturer and Medallist in 1969. He was also Foreign Member of the American Academy of Arts and Sciences (elected 1960), Fellow of the Royal Astronomical Society (elected 1933), Honorary Fellow of the Geological Society of America (1963) and the Geological Society of London (1967), and Fellow of the Royal Societies of New Zealand (1963) and of NSW (1974).

Bullen received the Thomas Ranken Lyle Medal of the Australian National Research Council (1949) He received the Bicentennial medal of Columbia University, New York, (1955), the Research medal of the Royal Society of Victoria (1966) and the Matthew Flinders Medal and Lecture awarded by Australian Academy of Science in 1969. He was awarded the William Bowie Medal of the American Geophysical Union in 1961, the Arthur L. Day Medal of the Geological Society of America in 1963, and the Gold Medal of the Royal Astronomical Society in 1974.

== Personal life ==
Bullen married Florence Mary Pressley (known as Mary) in Auckland in 1935 and they had two children, a son named John born in Auckland in 1936, and a daughter named Anne born in Melbourne in 1943.

Bullen's sister, Jean Maud Bullen, was a geoscientist at the Department of Scientific and Industrial Research in Christchurch, New Zealand.

== See also ==
- List of geophysicists

== Bibliography ==
- Australian Academy of Science biography
