= Peter Gavin Hall =

Australian statistician (1951–2016)

Peter Hall AO FAA FRS
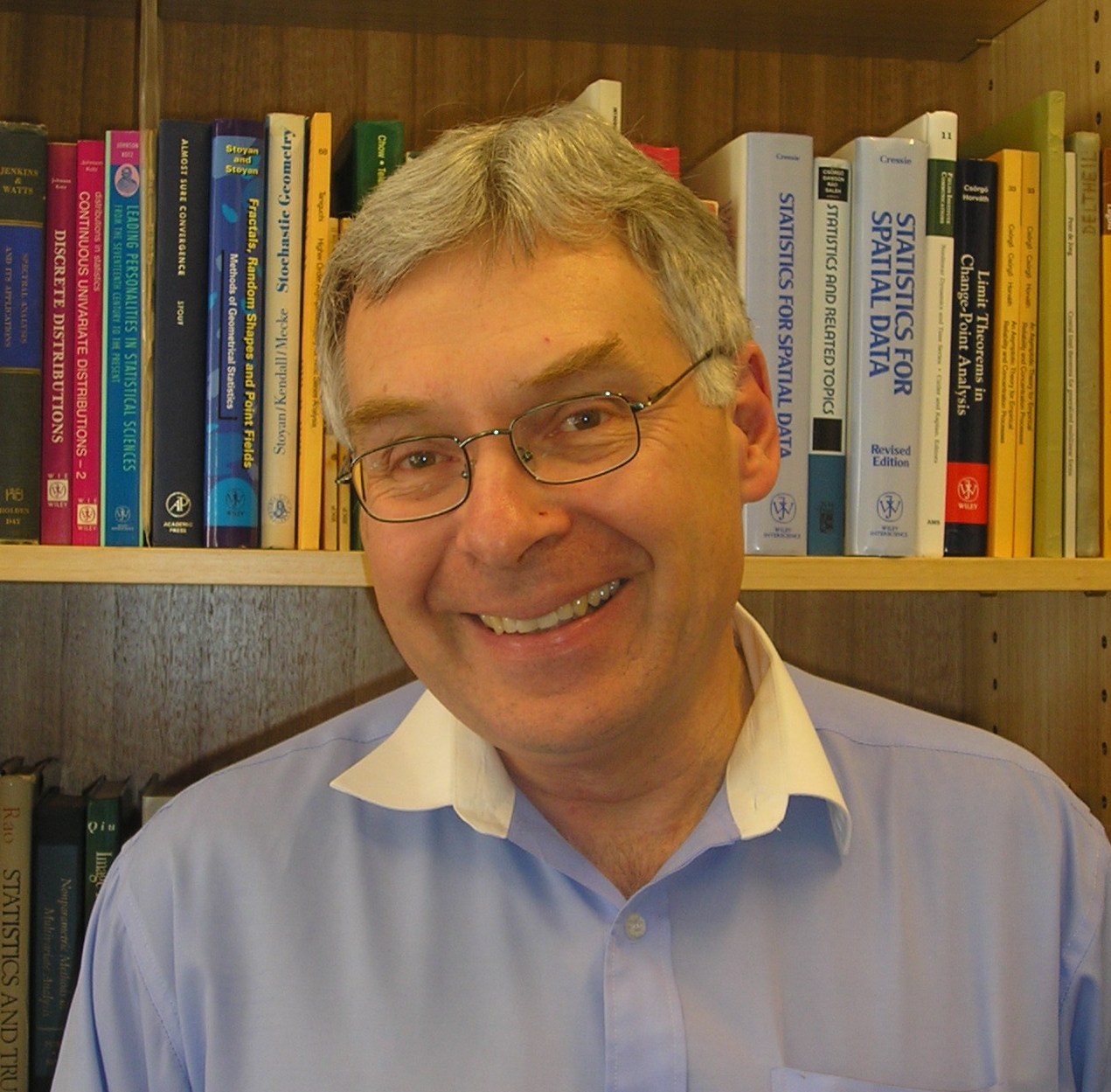
- Peter Hall in his office at The University of Melbourne in 2007
- Born: Peter Gavin Hall; 20 November 1951; Sydney
- Died: 9 January 2016 (aged 64); Melbourne
- Education: University of Sydney; Australian National University; University of Oxford (DPhil)
- Awards: Australian Laureate Fellowship (2011); Guy Medal (2011); George Szekeres Medal (2010); Rollo Davidson Prize (1986)
- Scientific career
- Fields: Mathematics; Statistics
- Workplaces: Australian National University; University of California Davis; University of Melbourne
- Thesis: Some problems in limit theory for stochastic processes and sums of random variables (1976)
- Doctoral advisor: John Kingman

Peter Gavin Hall AO FAA FRS (20 November 1951 – 9 January 2016) was an Australian researcher in probability theory and mathematical statistics. The American Statistical Association described him as one of the most influential and prolific theoretical statisticians in the history of the field. The School of Mathematics and Statistics Building at The University of Melbourne was renamed the Peter Hall building in his honour on 9 December 2016.

== Education ==
Hall attended Sydney Technical High School in Bexley, NSW during the years 1964–1969. He placed consistently high in examination results and in his final year, was among the top achievers in his form, and the winner of Old Boys' Union Mathematics prize.

Hall earned his Doctor of Philosophy degree at the University of Oxford in 1976 for research supervised by John Kingman.

== Career and research ==
Hall was an author in probability and statistics. MathSciNet lists 606 publications as of January 2016. He made contributions to nonparametric statistics, in particular for curve estimation and resampling: the bootstrap method, smoothing, density estimation, and bandwidth selection. He worked on numerous applications across fields of economics, engineering, physical science and biological science. Hall also made contributions to surface roughness measurement using fractals. In probability theory he made many contributions to limit theory, spatial processes and stochastic geometry. His paper "Theoretical comparison of bootstrap confidence intervals" (Annals of Statistics, 1988) has been reprinted in the Breakthroughs in Statistics collection.

He was an Australian Research Council (ARC) Laureate Fellow at the School of Mathematics and Statistics, University of Melbourne, and also had a joint appointment at University of California Davis. He previously held a professorship at the Centre for Mathematics and its Applications at the Australian National University.

=== Honours and awards ===
His awards and honours included:

- 2015 Fellow of the Academy of Social Sciences in Australia
- 2013 Foreign Associate, National Academy of Sciences
- 2013 Officer of the Order of Australia
- 2012 Wilks Memorial Award
- 2011 Australian Laureate Fellowship
- 2011 Guy Medal in Silver
- 2010 George Szekeres Medal
- 2009 Honorary Doctor of Science degree from The University of Sydney
- 2007 Matthew Flinders Medal and Lecture
- 2000 Elected a Fellow of the Royal Society (FRS)
- 1998 Invited Speaker of the International Congress of Mathematicians
- 1996 Fellow of the American Statistical Association
- 1994 Hannan Medal of the Australian Academy of Science
- 1990 Pitman Medal from the Statistical Society of Australia
- 1989 Committee of presidents of Statistical Societies Award
- 1987 Fellow of the Australian Academy of Science
- 1986 Rollo Davidson Prize, University of Cambridge
- 1986 Australian Mathematical Society Medal
- 1986 Edgeworth David Medal, Royal Society of New South Wales
- 1984 Fellow of Institute of Mathematical Statistics

=== Published books ===
- P. Hall; C.C. Heyde (1980): Martingale Limit Theory and its Application, Academic Press, New York. ISBN 0-12-319350-8
- P. Hall (1982): Rates of Convergence in the Central Limit Theorem, Pitman, London. ISBN 0-273-08565-4
- P. Hall (1988): Introduction to the Theory of Coverage Processes, Wiley, New York. ISBN 0-471-85702-5
- P. Hall (1992): The Bootstrap and Edgeworth Expansion, Springer, New York. ISBN 0-387-97720-1

== Personal life ==
Peter Hall was born to radiophysics and radio astronomy pioneer Ruby Payne-Scott and telephone technician William Holman Hall. His younger sister is artistic photographer and sculptor, Fiona Margaret Hall. Hall was a keen photographer with a special interest in train photography. He enjoyed travel and was a regular visitor to many universities around the world. He died of leukaemia in Melbourne on 9 January 2016. He is survived by his wife, Jeannie.
