= Terry Speed =

Australian statistician at the Walter and Eliza Hall Institute of Medical Research

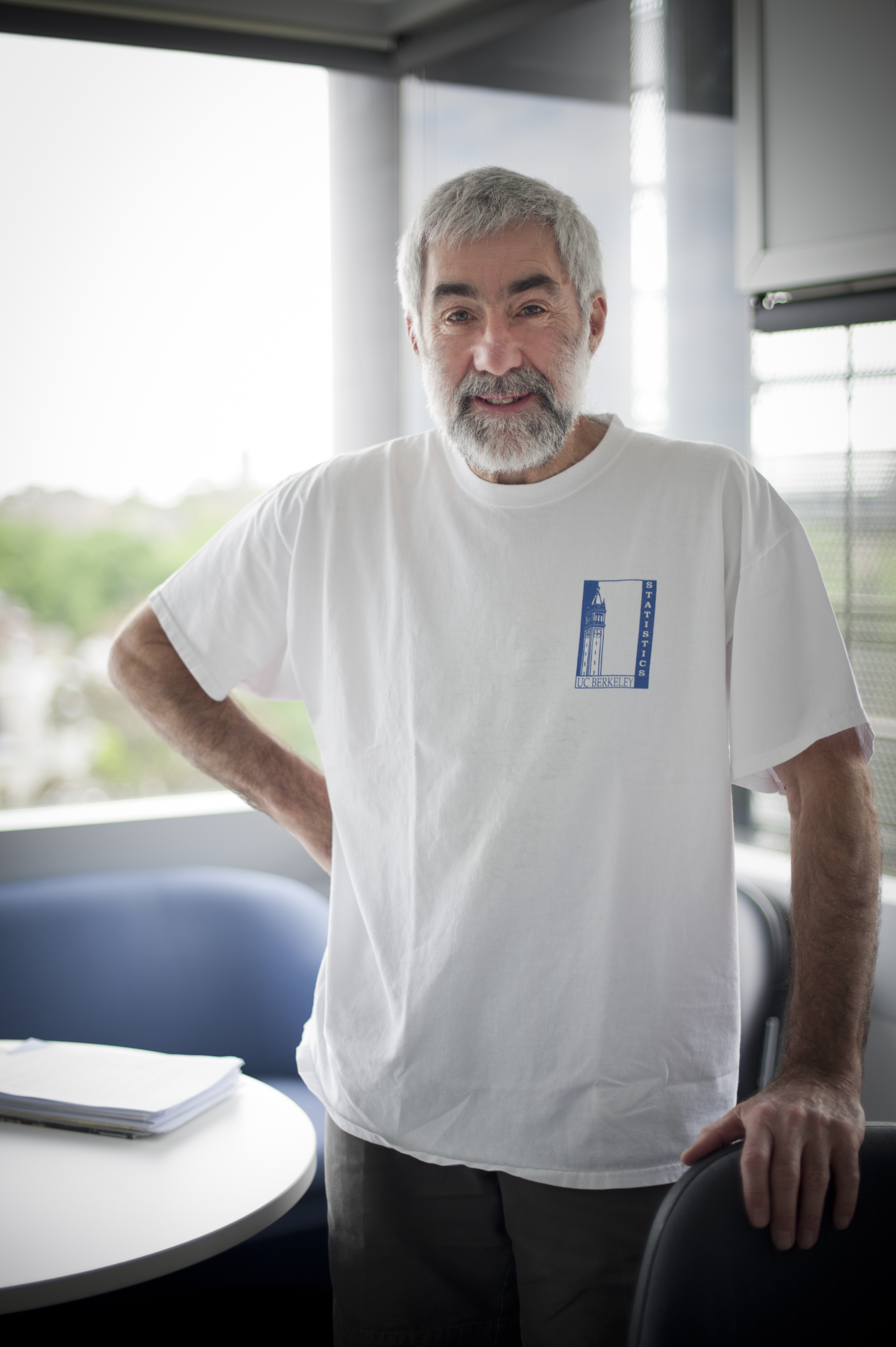
- Born: Terence Paul Speed; 14 March 1943 (age 83)
- Citizenship: Australia
- Education: Monash University (PhD)
- Spouse: Freda Elizabeth (Sally) Pollard (m. 1964)
- Awards: FRS (2013); Prime Minister's Prizes for Science (2013)
- Scientific career
- Fields: Statistics; Bioinformatics
- Workplaces: Walter and Eliza Hall Institute of Medical Research; University of California, Berkeley; University of Sheffield
- Thesis: Some topics in the theory of distributive lattices (1968)
- Doctoral advisor: Peter D. Finch
- Doctoral students: Jim Pitman; Sandrine Dudoit; Jean Yang; Bin Yu
- Website: www.wehi.edu.au/people/terry-speed

Terence Paul "Terry" Speed (born 14 March 1943 in Victor Harbor, South Australia), FAA FRS is an Australian statistician. A senior principal research scientist at the Walter and Eliza Hall Institute of Medical Research, he is known for his contributions to the analysis of variance and bioinformatics, and in particular to the analysis of microarray data.

== Early life and education ==
Terry Speed was born in Victor Harbor, in South Australia, and grew up in Melbourne. In 1961, he started a joint degree in medicine and science at the University of Melbourne, but later focussed on science only, obtaining a honours degree in mathematics and statistics in 1964.

Speed obtained a PhD from Monash University in 1968 with a thesis titled Some topics in the theory of distributive lattices under the supervision of Peter D. Finch.

== Career ==
After his PhD, Terry Speed took a lecturing position in Sheffield (United Kingdom), at the Manchester-Sheffield School of Probability and Statistics. In 1974, he returned to Australia, becoming assistant professor at the University of Western Australia, heading the statisticians in the department of mathematics. He then became professor in 1975 and head of department in 1982. In 1984, Terry Speed became chief of the division of mathematics and statistics at CSIRO, the Commonwealth Scientific and Industrial Research Organisation.

After a two-month visit in the department of statistics at the University of California, Berkeley in 1984, he applied for a permanent position and became a tenured professor there in 1987. In 1996, Suzanne Cory, director of the Walter and Eliza Hall Institute of Medical Research (WEHI), in Melbourne and former high-school classmate of Speed, invited him to start a bioinformatics group at the institute. Starting in 1997, he shared his time between the two institutions.

In 2009, he retired from the University of California, Berkeley, while keeping academic collaborations with the university, including the supervision of PhD students and postdocs. He started working full time at WEHI, where he was head of the Bioinformatics division until 31 August 2014, and has remained a laboratory head since then. He also served on the Mathematical Sciences jury for the Infosys Prize in 2009 and 2010.

In 2016, a former colleague and a former post-doctoral researcher from the University of California, Berkeley, filed a complaint of sexual harassment against Speed, with the allegedly infringing behavior occurring in 2002.

Speed has supervised at least 72 research students.

== Notable work ==
Terry Speed has contributed to a wide range of subjects, including distributive lattices, ring theory, analysis of variance and bioinformatics, and in particular to the analysis of microarray data.

=== Expert witness ===
Speed was an expert witness for the defense of O.J. Simpson at the trial for the O. J. Simpson murder case, as well as an expert witness in the Imanishi-Kari case, an affair of alleged scientific misconduct which involved biologist David Baltimore. Much earlier in his career, he was an expert defence witness in the 1966 trial of Ronald Ryan, the last person executed in Australia; however, his evidence that Ryan must have been at least 2.55 metres tall (he was only 1.73 metres) to fire the fatal shot failed to sway the jury.

== Awards and honours ==
In 1989 Speed was elected as a fellow of the American Statistical Association.

Speed was president of the Institute of Mathematical Statistics in 2004. In 2002, he received the Pitman medal. In 2009 he was awarded a NHMRC Australia Fellowship. On 30 October 2013, he received the Australian Prime Minister's Prize for Science. Speed was elected a Fellow of the Royal Society (FRS) of London in 2013. His nomination reads:

Speed is regarded internationally as THE expert on the analysis of microarray data. This results partly from the sheer ingenuity of his work, and in part it is due to his commitment to working closely with biomedical scientists, enabling him to appreciate first-hand the biological challenges and the consequent requirements of new methodology. Microarrays are now being replaced by short-read DNA sequencing, but Speed continues to contribute new ideas for the new technology. At other time in his career, Speed has made seminal contributions to bioinformatics, statistical genetics, the analysis of designed experiments, graphical models and Bayes networks.

== Personal life ==
Speed married Freda Elizabeth (Sally) Pollard in 1964.
