= Moran's theorem =

In population ecology, Moran's theorem (or the Moran effect) states that the time correlation of two separate populations of the same species is equal to the correlation between the environmental variabilities where they live.

The theorem is named after Pat Moran, who stated it in a paper on the dynamics of the Canadian lynx populations. It has been used to explain the synchronization of widely dispersed populations. It has the important consequence for conservation ecology that viability of spatially structured populations is lower than one would expect from the local populations: it increases the probability that several local populations go extinct simultaneously.

In its original form it stated: If the two populations have population dynamics given by

$$N_1(t+1)=f(N_1(t))+\epsilon_1(t)$$
$$N_2(t+1)=f(N_2(t))+\epsilon_2(t)$$

where $N_i$ is the population size of population $i$, $f$ is a linear renewal function updating the populations in the same way, and $\epsilon_i$ the environmental variabilities. Then $\rho_{N_1,N_2}=\rho_{\epsilon_1,\epsilon_2}$; where $\rho_{N_1,N_2}$ is the correlation between the populations and $\rho_{\epsilon_1,\epsilon_2}$ the correlation between their environments. This means that the populations are correlated by their environments without any other explicit coupling term and this effect does not rely on a particular form of the renewal function $f$.

The original form assumed a strictly linear structure, but this assumption can be weakened to allow for non-linear functions. It has been suggested that the term "Moran effect" should be used for systems that do not strictly follow the original description. In the general case the correlations will be lower, and the accuracy of the Moran description depends on whether the populations tend to converge to an equilibrium state (good accuracy for low variance variability) or tend to oscillate (eventual breakdown of the correlation).

It has been tested experimentally in a number of cases, such as variation of fruit production, acorn production, bird populations and coral reef fishes.
