= Edward J. Hannan =

Australian statistician

Professor Edward J. Hannan FAA FASSA

Personal details
- Born: 29 January 1921
- Died: 7 January 1994 (aged 72)
- Occupation: Statistician

Edward James Hannan (29 January 1921 – 7 January 1994) was an Australian statistician who was the co-discoverer of the Hannan–Quinn information criterion. He studied at the University of Melbourne and completed a PhD at the Australian National University under the supervision of Patrick A. P. Moran.

For the majority of his working life he was attached the Australian National University. He was Professor of Statistics in the Institute of Advanced Studies 1971–1986, Professor of Statistics in the School of General Studies 1959–1971, and Fellow in Statistics 1954–1958.

His research was in the field of time series analysis, both in statistics and econometrics. He is the author of four books, one with Manfred Deistler.

The Statistical Society of Australia awarded him the Pitman Medal in recognition of his life's work. In 1970 he was elected to the Australian Academy of Science. He also won the 1979 Thomas Ranken Lyle Medal of the Australian Academy of Science.

Hannan had left school at the age of 15, becoming a bank clerk for Commonwealth Bank before entering the Australian Army in 1941 and seeing action as a lieutenant during the New Guinea campaign. A full account of his life and work is contained in the Biographical Memoirs of the Australian Academy of Science.

Hannan is the namesake of the Hannan Medal awarded by the Australian Academy of Science.
