= Frank Smithies =

British mathematician (1912–2002)

- Born: 10 March 1912; Edinburgh, Scotland
- Died: 16 November 2002 (aged 90); Cambridge, England
- Education: University of Cambridge
- Awards: FRSE
- Scientific career
- Fields: Mathematics
- Workplaces: University of Cambridge
- Thesis: The Theory of Linear Integral Equations (1937)
- Doctoral advisor: G. H. Hardy
- Doctoral students: Graham Allan; E. N. Dancer; Douglas Northcott; Seymour Papert; John R. Ringrose; Dona Strauss; Trevor West

Frank Smithies FRSE (10 March 1912 – 16 November 2002) was a British mathematician who worked on integral equations, functional analysis, and the history of mathematics. He was elected as a fellow of the Royal Society of Edinburgh in 1961. He was an alumnus and an academic of Cambridge University.

== Publications ==
- Smithies, F. (1958), Integral equations, Cambridge Tracts in Mathematics and Mathematical Physics, vol. 49, Cambridge University Press, ISBN 978-0-521-06502-3, MR 0104991
- Smithies, F. (1997), Cauchy and the creation of complex function theory, Cambridge University Press, ISBN 0-521-59278-X
