= Sandrine Dudoit =

French-American bioinformatician

- Scientific career
- Institutions: Stanford University; University of California, Berkeley
- Patrons: Carleton University; University of California, Berkeley
- Thesis: Linkage Analysis of Complex Human Traits Using Identity by Descent Data (1999)
- Doctoral advisor: Terry Speed
- Other academic advisors: Patrick O. Brown
- Website: www.stat.berkeley.edu/users/sandrine/

Sandrine Dudoit is a professor of statistics and public health at the University of California, Berkeley. Her research applies statistics to microarray and genetic data; she is known as one of the founders of the open-source Bioconductor project for the development of bioinformatics software.

== Education and career ==
Dudoit studied for the French baccalauréat in mathematics and physical sciences at the Lycée Molière in Paris. She moved to Canada for her undergraduate studies, completing a bachelor's degree in mathematics in 1992 at Carleton University.

As a beginning graduate student in the department of statistics at the University of California, Berkeley, Dudoit was the recipient of the Gertrude Cox Scholarship of the American Statistical Association's Committee on Women in Statistics. She earned her doctorate at Berkeley in 1999. Her dissertation, Linkage Analysis of Complex Human Traits Using Identity by Descent Data, was supervised by Terry Speed.

== Career and research ==
After postdoctoral research with Patrick O. Brown at Stanford University, she joined the division of biostatistics in the UC Berkeley School of Public Health as an assistant professor in 2001. She added a joint appointment in the department of statistics in 2006.

Dudoit and Mark van der Laan are the authors of the book Multiple Testing Procedures with Applications to Genomics. Dudoit is the editor of the book Selected Works of Terry Speed and co-editor of Bioinformatics and Computational Biology Solutions Using R and Bioconductor.

=== Awards and honors ===
Dudoit was elected as a Fellow of the American Statistical Association in 2010. She became an Elected Member of the International Statistical Institute in 2014, and a Fellow of the Institute of Mathematical Statistics in 2021.
