= Henry Oliver Lancaster =

Australian mathematical statistician

Henry OliverLancaster AO FAA, (1 February 1913, Sydney – 2 December 2001, Sydney), was an Australian mathematical statistician and Foundation Professor of Mathematical Statistics at the University of Sydney. After initial actuarial and accounting studies, Lancaster trained in medicine, particularly in pathology, where he employed a strong element of statistical analysis.

From 1946 to 1959, Lancaster did work in tropical medicine in Sydney and London. From 1959 to 1978, he was Professor of Mathematical Statistics at the University of Sydney.
