= Australian Academy of Science =

Academy of sciences

Coordinates: 35°17′1.2″S 149°7′21.4″E

- Academy Coat of Arms

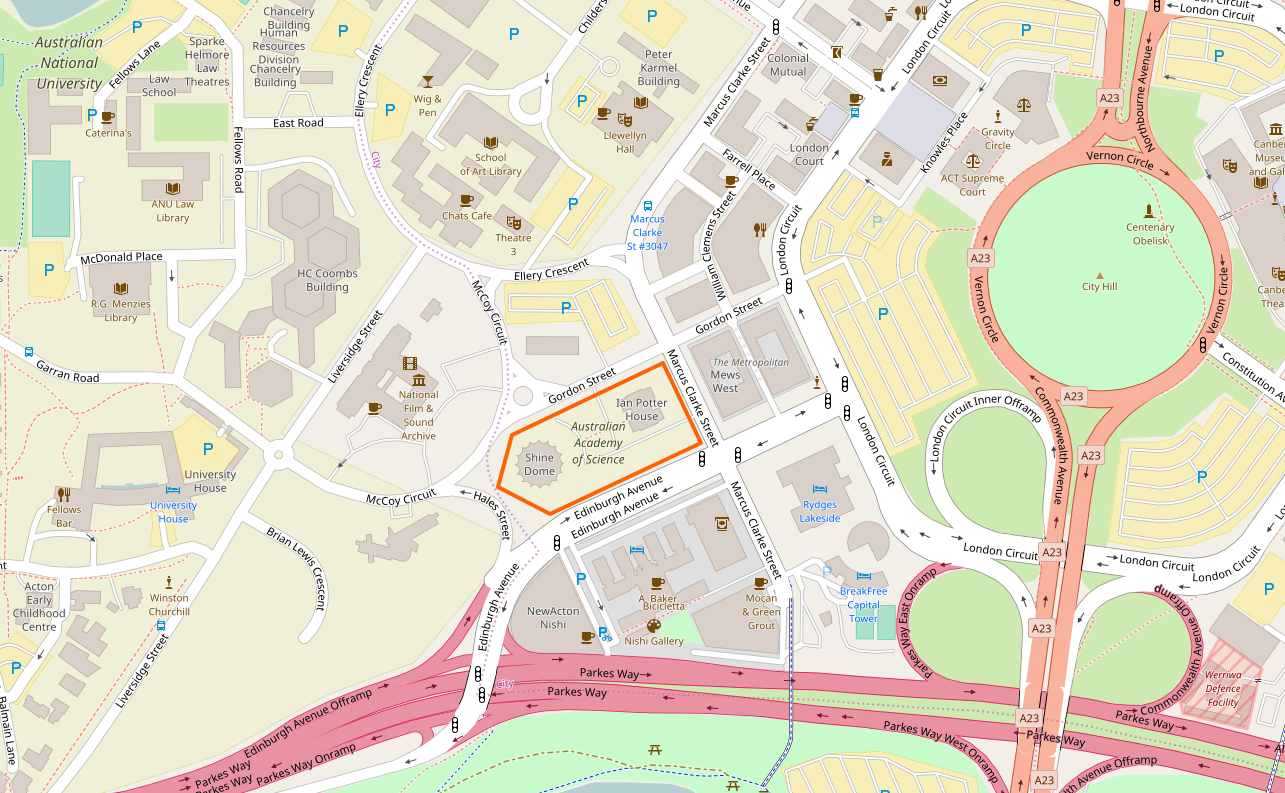
- Location of the Australian Academy of Science in Canberra
- Formation: 1954
- Headquarters: Canberra, Australian Capital Territory
- Members: ≈500 Fellows
- President: Chennupati Jagadish
- Website: www.science.org.au

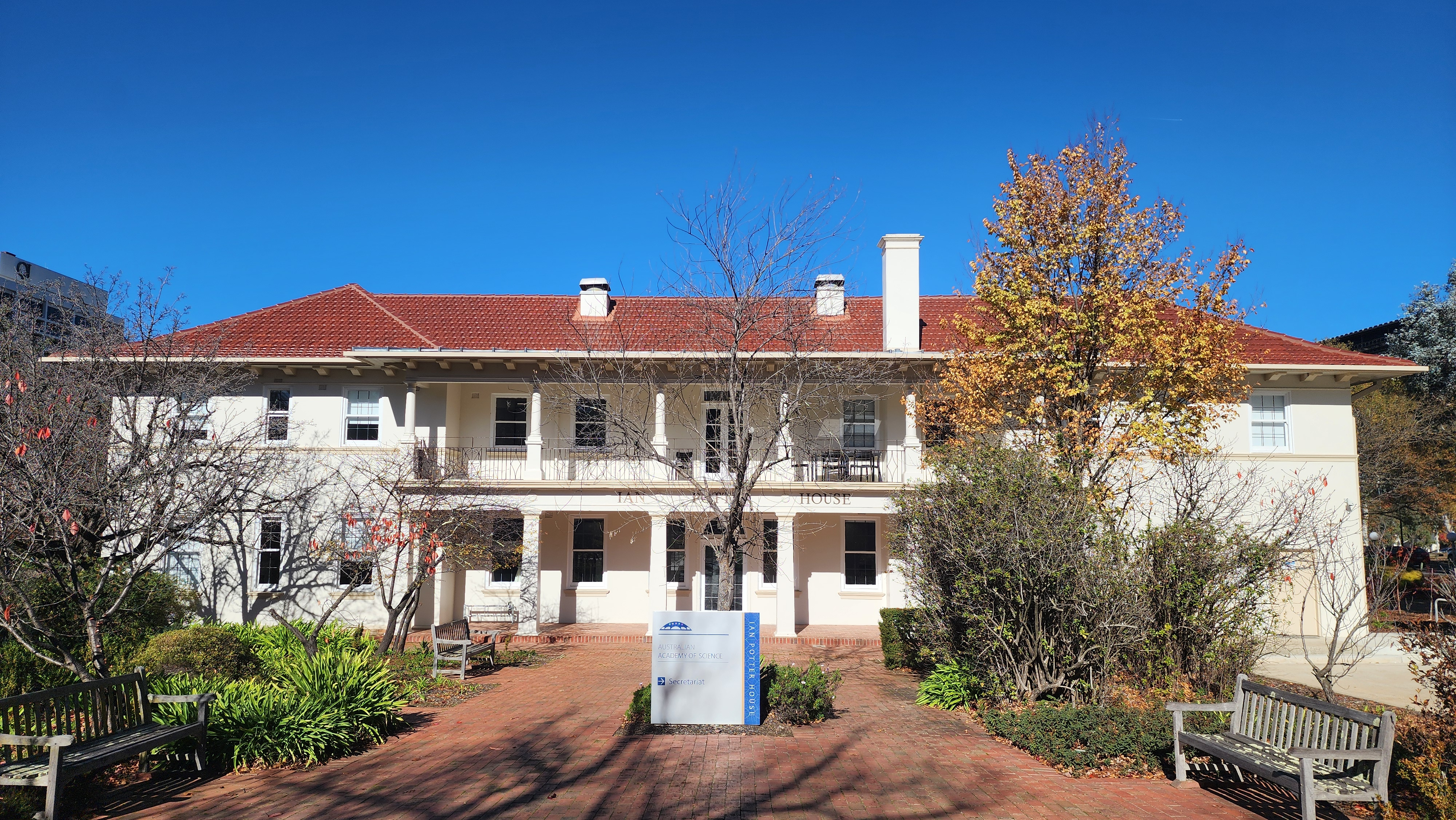
Ian Potter House

The Australian Academy of Science is a scientific academy. It was founded in 1954 by a group of distinguished Australians, including Australian Fellows of the Royal Society of London, after its forerunner, the Australian National Research Council had been dissolved. The Academy Secretariat is in Canberra, at the Shine Dome.

== History ==
On 21 August 1919 the Australasian Research Council, based in Sydney, was established to represent Australia on the International Research Council. The council was formalised by the Australasian Association for the Advancement of Science (AAAS) and renamed the Australian National Research Council (ANRC) in July 1921.

In 1951, following a scientific conference organised by the Australian National University, a new body, the Australian Academy of Science was proposed, after it was generally agreed that the ANRC "had failed to achieve the status that was required of a national body with such weighty responsibilities". The new academy was established in 1954, and, after it had assumed most of functions of the ANRC, the ANRC was dissolved in 1955, the final meeting taking place in Canberra on 16 August 1955.

The academy was founded by a group of Australians, among them Australian Fellows of the Royal Society in London. The first president was Sir Mark Oliphant.

== Governance and description ==
The Australian Academy of Science is modelled after the Royal Society, and operates under a Royal charter; as such, it is an independent body, but it has government endorsement.

The objectives of the academy are to promote science and science education through a wide range of activities; officially "promoting, declaring and disseminating scientific knowledge".

It has defined four major program areas:

- Recognition of outstanding contributions to science
- Education and public awareness
- Science policy
- International relations

The academy also runs the 22 National Committees for Science, which provide a forum to discuss issues relevant to all the scientific disciplines in Australia.

== Education ==
The Australian Academy of Science has been producing educational resources since 1967. Its first published resource was Biological Science: the Web of Life, authored by David Morgan. The Academy supports the development of evidence-based education programs in science and mathematics. As of 2025, the Academy delivers three programs: Primary Connections for primary school science education, Science Connections for secondary school science education, and a combined mathematics program called reSolve.

In 2003, the Australian Academy of Science began research on how to best support teachers of science and mathematics subjects through pedagogical-based resources rather than content-based resources. By 2005, the Australian Government announced they would support the program Primary Connections through the Department of Education, Science and Training (DEST) under the Australian Government Quality Teacher Programme in establishing eight curriculum units, developed and trialed in 2005. The Australian Government wanted to use the program to "improve learning outcomes in science and literacy through a sophisticated professional learning program supported with rich curriculum resources that will improve teachers' knowledge of science and science teaching". 106 trial teachers participated in 56 trial schools across Australia. At this time, Primary Connections used hard-copy and digital materials constructed for teachers to adapt to primary school classrooms based closely on the 5Es model of learning which had served as the foremost pedagogical structure for teaching in science education. Primary Connections has been reported to have a 'positive impact on schools, teachers, and students'. Currently, the Academy's education programs are funded by the Department of Education to improve teacher confidence and capability in teaching mathematics and science.

Since 2020, Primary Connections has had an increasing focus on interactivity for students, piloting online professional learning, and research and review of the development of STEM teacher resources. As part of a review of teacher needs, Primary Connections ended the sale of hard-copy resources at the end of 2020. In addition, the Primary Connections and its sister program Science Connections (launched in 2025) are constructed around a new learning structure: the Launch, Inquire, Act (LIA) Framework.

=== Launch, Inquire, Act (LIA) Framework ===
The LIA Framework was designed to address a stated need from surveyed teachers for an online resource that allows teachers to readily select, adapt and build their own program of work within the framework of Australia's science curriculum. Coinciding with the continuing uptake of Version 9.0 of the Australian Curriculum in 2024, a new suite of online resources are being developed for Foundation to Year 10 that align with the updated curriculum and with the LIA framework while maintaining more adaptable, clearly framed lessons for teachers during the implementation.

The LIA Framework begins with the "Launch" phase, which was designed to engage students and provide both motivation and context for their learning. The Launch phase encourages students to begin scientific inquiry on a topic through common experiences that connect with their lives (for example, by having students walk into a darkened classroom with all electricity turned off to demonstrate the importance of electricity). This allows all students to develop a common language and provides equity in learning. Next is the "Inquire" phase, which consists of cycles of inquiry, promoting deepening understanding. Students improve their knowledge of a topic via questioning, investigations, and contextual integration (for example, how a torch can be made with a battery, wires, and a bulb: experimenting with different forms of circuits). The last phase, "Act", aims to empower students to act on their newly acquired knowledge and skills. It encourages students to have agency by designing new ways to interact with the world via science (for example, using their circuitry experiments to design an electrical product to support people in a blackout).

== The Shine Dome ==
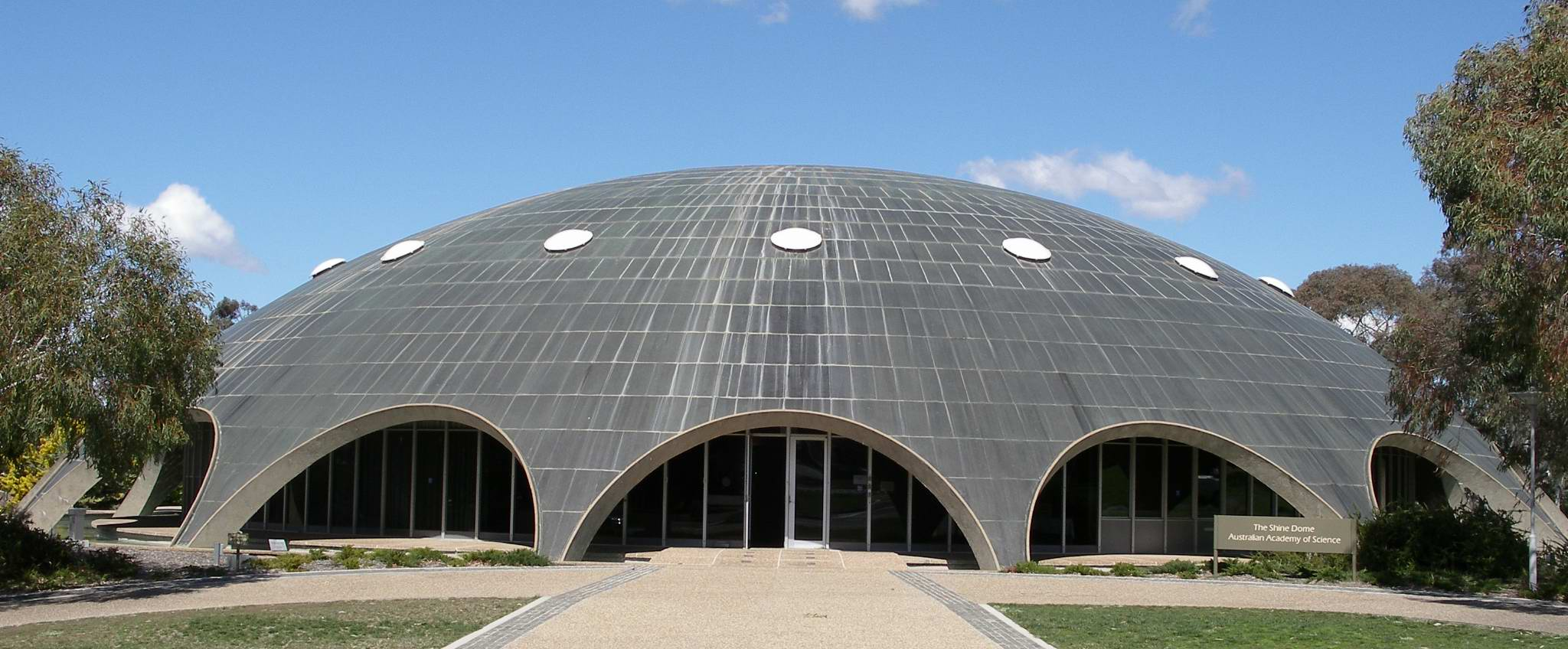
The Shine Dome

The Shine Dome (previously known as Becker House) is a well-known Canberra landmark, notable for its unusual structure, and colloquially referred to as "The Martian Embassy", an allusion to its shape and the fact that as the capital of Australia, Canberra is the home of foreign embassies. It was designed by architect Sir Roy Grounds, of Grounds, Romberg and Boyd. When completed in 1959 its 45.75-metre-diameter dome was the largest in Australia.

On 1 December 1956, the academy's building design committee met in Adelaide to look over plans submitted by six architects. The plan accepted involved a 710-tonne reinforced concrete dome, which had to be supported by 16 thin supports. The concrete is approximately 60 cm thick at the base supports, and 10 cm at the top. The dome supports itself, with no internal wall holding it up. It cost £200,000 to build. The foundation stone, laid on 2 May 1958 by Prime Minister of Australia, Robert Menzies, was originally part of the pier of the Great Melbourne Telescope constructed in 1869 under the supervision of the Royal Society and transferred to Mount Stromlo Observatory in the 1940s.

The building was named Becker House, for benefactor and Fellow of the Academy Sir Jack Ellerton Becker, in 1962. In 2000, it was renamed in honour of Fellow John Shine, who donated one million dollars to renovate the dome.

The interior contains three floors: on the ground level, the main auditorium, the Ian Wark Theatre, seats 156 people, the Jaeger Room for functions and meetings, the Becker Council Meeting Room and offices; the upper level includes a gallery to the theatre and the Adolf Basser Library; and the basement houses storage for historical records of science in Australia.

In 2016, the dome appeared in the television documentary series about Australian modernist architecture Streets of Your Town presented by Tim Ross.

On 20 January 2020 the Dome was seriously damaged by a hailstorm with smashed skylights and denting of the copper roof surface.

== Fellows ==
The Fellowship of the Australian Academy of Science is made up of around 500 leading Australian scientists. Scientists judged by their peers to have made an exceptional contribution to knowledge in their field may be elected to Fellowship of the academy. Twenty new Fellows may be elected every year.

No more than two Fellows may be elected every three years on the basis of distinguished contributions to science by means other than personal research. A small number of distinguished foreign scientists with substantial connections to Australian science are elected as Corresponding Members.

Fellows are denoted by the letters FAA (Fellow of the Australian Academy of Science) after their name.

=== Foundation Fellows ===
When the academy was founded in 1954 there were 24 members, known as the Foundation Fellows:

Name	Field
Keith Edward Bullen	Mathematics and geophysics
Frank Macfarlane Burnet	Virology and immunology (Nobel laureate)
David Guthrie Catcheside	Genetics
Thomas MacFarland Cherry	Mathematics
Ian Clunies Ross	Parasitology and science administration
Edmund Alfred Cornish	Statistics
John Eccles	Neuroscience (Nobel laureate)
Edwin Sherbon Hills	Geology
Leonard Huxley	Physics
Raymond James Wood Le Fèvre	Chemistry
Max Rudolf Lemberg	Biochemistry
Hedley Ralph Marston	Biochemistry
Leslie Martin	Physics
David Forbes Martyn	Physics
Douglas Mawson	Geology
Alexander John Nicholson	Entomology
Mark Oliphant	Physics
Joseph Lade Pawsey	Radiophysics and astronomy
James Arthur Prescott	Agricultural science
David Rivett	Chemistry
Thomas Gerald Room	Mathematics
Sydney Sunderland	Neuroscience
Oscar Werner Tiegs	Zoology
Richard van der Riet Woolley	Astronomy

== Presidents ==
- Sir Mark Oliphant (1954–1957)
- Sir John Eccles (1957–1961)
- Sir Thomas Cherry (1961–1964)
- Sir Frank Macfarlane Burnet (1965–69)
- David Martyn (1969–1970)
- Dorothy Hill (1970)
- Sir Rutherford Robertson (1970–1974)
- Sir Geoffrey Badger (1974–1978)
- Lloyd Evans (1978–1982)
- Arthur Birch (1982–1986)
- David Curtis (1986–1990)
- David Craig (1990–1994)
- Sir Gustav Nossal (1994–1998)
- Brian Anderson (1998–2002)
- Jim Peacock (2002–2006)
- Kurt Lambeck (2006–2010)
- Suzanne Cory (2010–2014)
- Andrew Holmes (2014–2018)
- John Shine (2018–2022)
- Chennupati Jagadish (2022–)

== Awards ==
Early career awards:

- Anton Hales Medal to recognise distinguished research in the Earth sciences;
- Dorothy Hill Medal to recognise research in the Earth sciences by female researchers;
- Fenner Medal, to recognise distinguished research in biology;
- Gottschalk Medal, to recognise outstanding research in the medical sciences;
- John Booker Medal, to recognise outstanding research in the sciences that underpin engineering;
- Le Fèvre Medal, to recognise outstanding basic research in chemistry;
- Pawsey Medal, to recognise outstanding research in physics;
- Ruth Stephens Gani Medal, to recognise distinguished research in human genetics, including clinical, molecular, population and epidemiological genetics and cytogenetics.
- Moran Medal to recognise outstanding research in one or more of the fields of applied probability, biometrics, mathematical genetics, psychometrics and statistics (awarded every two years).

Mid career awards:

- Gustav Nossal Medal, to health researchers;
- Jacques Miller Medal, to experimental biomedicine researchers;
- Nancy Millis Medal for Women in Science.

Career awards recognising lifelong achievement:

- David Craig Medal and Lecture, for researchers in chemistry;
- Haddon King Medal, for researchers in earth science;
- Hannan Medal, for researchers in mathematics;
- Ian Wark Medal and Lecture;
- Jaeger Medal, for researchers in earth science;
- Thomas Ranken Lyle Medal, for researchers in mathematics or physics;
- Macfarlane Burnet Medal and Lecture, for research in the biological sciences;
- Matthew Flinders Medal and Lecture, for researchers in physical science;
- Mawson Lecture and Medal, for researchers in earth science;
- Ruby Payne-Scott Medal and Lecture, for women in science;
- Suzanne Cory Medal, for research in the biological sciences.

Other awards include:

- Academy Medal for outstanding contributions to science by means other than through scientific research;
- Lloyd Rees Lecture, for lectures in chemical physics;
- Selby Fellowship awarded to distinguished overseas scientists to visit Australia for public lecture/seminar tours.

== Other learned Academies ==
There are three other learned Academies in Australia, those of Humanities (Australian Academy of the Humanities), Social Science (Academy of the Social Sciences in Australia) and Technological Sciences and Engineering (Australian Academy of Technological Sciences and Engineering). The four Academies cooperate through the Australian Council of Learned Academies, formed in 2010.

== Arms ==
Coat of arms of the Australian Academy of Science
Adopted Granted by the Kings of Arms, 1 March 1965 (Earl Marshal's warrant, 30 December 1964). Crest On a Wreath of the Colours a demi Swan rousant Sable Ducally gorged Or, the wings charged with a conventional representation of the nucleus of an Atom with three Particles in orbit Or. Torse Argent and Azure. Helm A closed Helmet. Escutcheon Azure, a representation of the building of the Australian Academy of Science at Canberra ensigned of a Mullet of seven points Argent on a Canton Argent a representation of the Royal Crown proper. Supporters On the dexter side a Kangaroo and on the sinister side a Talbot both proper and Ducally gorged Or. Compartment A field of Grass Vert. Other elements Mantling Azure doubled Argent. Symbolism Escutcheon: The seven-pointed silver star on a blue field represents the Commonwealth of Australia as it appears on the National Flag. The representation of the Academy building, the Shine Dome that was completed in 1959, follows the practice of armigers including a representation of their own castle. The royal crown in the canton was included by special permission of Queen Elizabeth II in recognition of the royal charter of the Academy, while the three animals in the arms (kangaroo, talbot, and swan) are gorged (collared) by a coronet to signify the Royal oversight of the Academy through the charter. Crest: Biological science is represented by the Black swan (which also appears as a supporter on the Coat of Arms of the City of Canberra), and physical science by the atom symbol on its wing. Supporters: The Red Kangaroo is taken from the Australian arms, while the White hound supporter is identical to the supporters of the arms of the Royal Society of London and was included by permission of the Royal Society to signify the close relations of the two bodies and the role of Royal Society Fellows in the Australian academy's establishment.

== See also ==
- List of Australian organisations with royal patronage
