= Hans van Houwelingen =

Dutch mathematician (1945–2026)

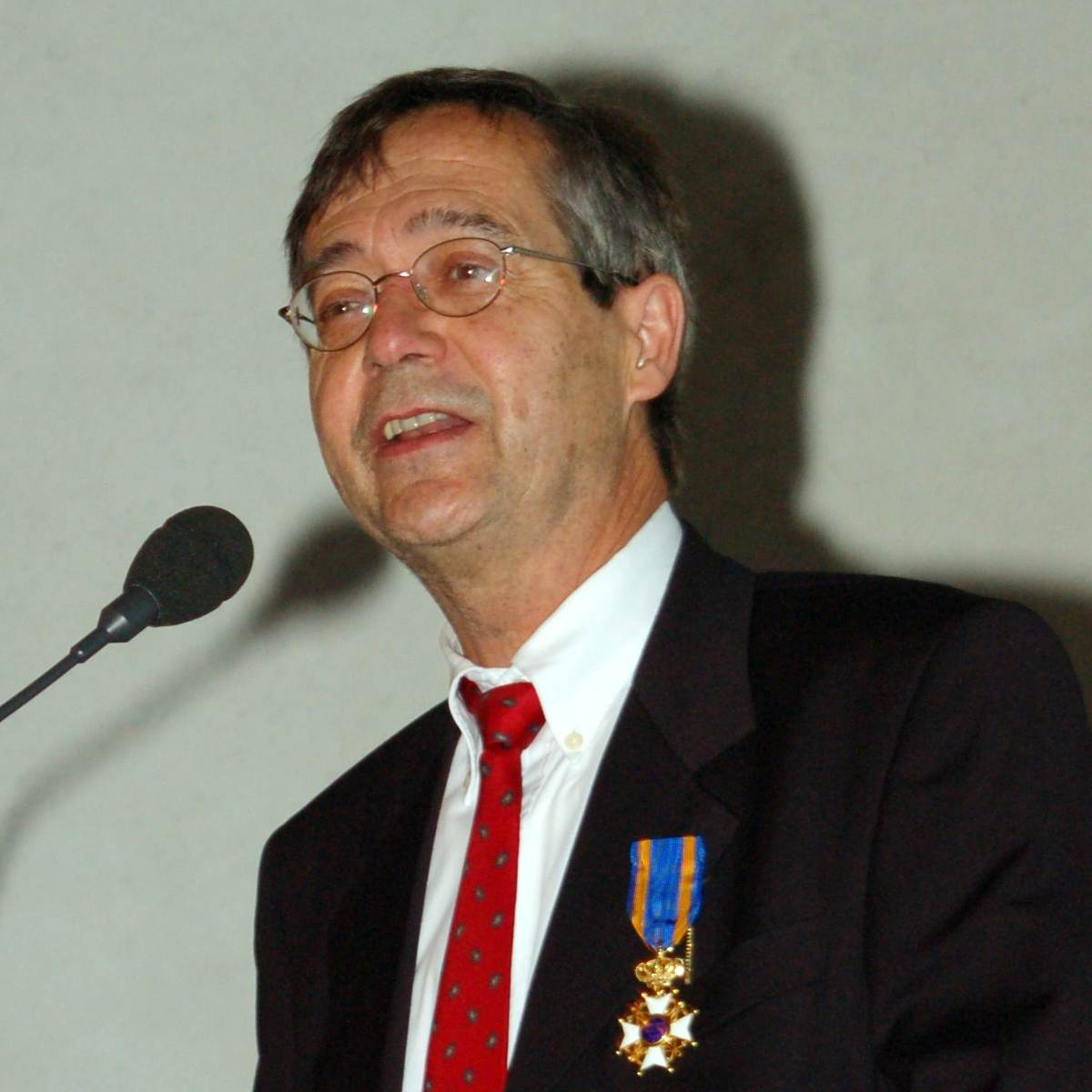
- Van Houwelingen in 2008
- Born: Johannes Cornelis van Houwelingen; 25 March 1945; Rotterdam, German-occupied Netherlands
- Died: 14 May 2026 (aged 81); De Bilt, Netherlands
- Education: Utrecht University
- Scientific career
- Workplaces: Utrecht University; Leiden University
- Thesis: On empirical Bayes rules for the continuous one-parameter exponential family (1973)
- Doctoral advisor: Gerard Leppink
- Doctoral students: Jeanine Houwing-Duistermaat

Johannes Cornelis "Hans" van Houwelingen (25 March 1945 – 14 May 2026) was a Dutch mathematician and a professor of medical statistics at Leiden University.

== Life and career ==
After graduating from Utrecht University in 1968 with a major in mathematics and a minor in theoretical physics and mathematical statistics, Van Houwelingen started working at Utrecht University at the Institute for Mathematical Statistics. In 1969 he joined Philips. A year later he returned to the Institute for Mathematical Statistics. Van Houwelingen earned his PhD at Utrecht University in 1973; his dissertation, entitled On empirical Bayes rules for the continuous one-parameter exponential family, was supervised by Gerard Jan Leppink. He was appointed a professor at Leiden University in 1986. Van Houwelingen's research was focused mainly on survival analysis.

In his retirement speech on 26 November 2008, Van Houwelingen stated that "Expecting the Unexpected is a very accurate job description for a biostatistician. The mission of statisticians is to anticipate what could happen and assist others in forming sensible responses. This mission is not limited to advising others. It also concerns research in their own field." He continued to publish as an emeritus, at least until 2024.

Van Houwelingen died in De Bilt on 14 May 2026, at the age of 81.

== Awards and honours ==
Year	Organisation	Award / Honour
1992	Biometrics Section of Dutch Statistical Society	Dutch Biometry Award for joint paper with S. le Cessie
1994	Biometrics Section of Dutch Statistical Society	Dutch Biometry Award for joint paper with P.J.M. Verweij
2001	American Statistical Association	Fellow
2006	Biometrics Section of Dutch Statistical Society	Dutch Biometry Award for joint paper with R. Elgalta, J.J. Houwing-Duistermaat, C. van Duijn
2007	Dutch region of the International Biometric Society	Honorary Member
2008	Biometrics Section of Dutch Statistical Society	Honorary Member
2008	Dutch Government	Knight in the Order of the Netherlands Lion (26 November 2008)
2010	International Biometric Society	An issue of the Biometrical Journal was dedicated to Van Houwelingen.
2011	International Society for Clinical Biostatistics	Honorary Member
2015	Biometrics Section of Dutch Statistical Society	The biannual BMS-ANed Biometry Award was renamed Hans van Houwelingen Biometry Award
2018	International Biometric Society	Honorary Life Member (Tuesday 10 July 2018 at the IBS Awards Ceremony)

== Books ==
- Inleiding tot de medische statistiek (in Dutch), 1993, with Theo Stijnen and Roel van Strik, ISBN 9789036813037
- Dynamic Prediction in Clinical Survival Analysis, 2011, with Hein Putter, published by Taylor & Francis, ISBN 9781439835333
- Handbook of Survival Analysis, 2013, with John P. Klein, Joseph G. Ibrahim, and Thomas H. Scheike, published by Taylor & Francis, ISBN 9781466555662
