= Maria-Pia Geppert =

German mathematician

Maria-Pia Geppert (May 28, 1907 – November 18, 1997) was a German mathematician and biostatistician who co-founded the Biometrical Journal.

Geppert was the first woman to become a full professor at the University of Tübingen. With Emmy Noether, Hilda Geiringer, Ruth Moufang, and Hel Braun, Geppert was one of only a handful of women to work in mathematics in Germany before World War II and later convert their degrees into research careers as full professors.

== Early life and education ==
Geppert was born in Breslau, with Italian descent through her mother. Breslau is now Wrocław, in Poland, but at that time it was part of the German Empire. Her older brother, Harald Geppert also became a mathematician, and a supporter of the Nazis.

She studied mathematics in Breslau and in Giessen, and in 1932 completed a doctorate at the University of Breslau. Her dissertation, Approximative Darstellungen analytischer Funktionen, die durch Dirichletsche Reihen gegeben sind, concerned analytic number theory and was supervised by Guido Hoheisel. Edmund Landau, in his last publication before Hitler came to power, commented unfavorably on one of her papers.

Next, Geppert moved to Rome, where from 1933 to 1936 she studied actuarial science and statistics for a second doctorate under the supervision of Guido Castelnuovo. She completed a habilitation in 1942 at the University of Giessen. Her dissertation was Comparison of Two Observed Frequencies. Seneta & Phipps (2001) write that her habilitation dissertation was "important but forgotten" because of the circumstances of the war, and they adopt her title for their own.

== Career ==
In 1940, Geppert became director of the Department of Epidemiology and Statistics for the William G. Kerckhoff Heart Research Institute in Bad Nauheim, later to become the Max Planck Institute for Heart and Lung Research. She joined Goethe University Frankfurt in 1943, as a lecturer in biostatistics.

In 1964 she became chair for medical biometry at the University of Tübingen. In doing so, she became the first female full professor at the University of Tübingen. She retired in 1975.

== Biometrical Journal ==
With Ottokar Heinisch, Geppert founded the Biometrical Journal in 1959. She was co-editor-in-chief with Heinisch from its founding until 1966, and remained co-editor-in-chief with Erna Weber until 1969.

== Recognition ==
In 1951, Geppert became the first German elected into the International Statistical Institute in the post-war period. She also became an honorary member of the International Biometric Society in 1965, the first person from the German region of the society to be so honored.
