= Biometrical Journal =

- Discipline: Statistics
- Language: English
- Edited by: Hans Ulrich Burger, Monica Chiogna, Jochem König

Publication details
- History: Since 1959
- Publisher: Wiley-VCH
- Frequency: Bimonthly
- Open access: Hybrid
- Impact factor: 1.8 (2024)

Standard abbreviations
- ISO 4: Biom. J.

Indexing
- CODEN: BIJODN
- ISSN: 0323-3847 (print); 1521-4036 (web)
- LCCN: 78646433
- OCLC no.: 231016212

Links
- Journal homepage; Online access; Online archive

Biometrical Journal is a bimonthly peer-reviewed scientific journal covering research on statistical methods and their applications in life sciences including medicine, environmental sciences, and agriculture. Typical articles contain both, the development of methodology and its application. At present, articles are accompanied on the publisher's web site by computer code and illustrative data sets for the sake of reproducible research. The code is checked by an appointed reproducible research editor before it is published as supplementary material.

The journal is published by Wiley-VCH in cooperation with the German and Austro-Swiss Regions of the International Biometric Society electronically and in print using the English language.

== History ==
Ten years after the foundation of the Federal Republic of Germany (FRG) and the German Democratic Republic (GDR), Ottokar Heinisch (Leipzig, GDR) and Maria-Pia Geppert (Bad Nauheim, FRG) jointly started to publish the journal in Akademie Verlag in 1959 under the title Biometrische Zeitschrift, as the scientific journal of the International Biometric Society's German Region, which had been meeting annually since 1953. Twelve years after the Berlin Wall had been built and under pressure from GDR authorities, a separate Region GDR was established to cut off the contacts with the FRG. The journal adopted its English title Biometrical Journal in 1976, when Erna Weber (Berlin, GDR) was its editor. Both IBS Regions reunited soon after German reunification. First editor after that was Jürgen Läuter (Magdeburg) followed by Peter Bauer (Vienna). In 2004, the Austro-Swiss and the German Region of IBS and Wiley-VCH decided that both regions nominate the editors and subscribe to the online version of the journal starting with the editorship of Edgar Brunner (Göttingen) and Martin Schumacher (Freiburg).

=== Editors-in-chief ===
The following persons are or have been editors-in-chief:

- 1959–1966 Ottokar Heinisch and Maria-Pia Geppert
- 1966–1968 Maria-Pia Geppert and Erna Weber
- 1968–1988 Erna Weber
- 1989–1995 Heinz Ahrens and Klaus Bellmann
- 1996–1999 Jürgen Läuter
- 2000–2003 Peter Bauer
- 2004–2008 Edgar Brunner and Martin Schumacher
- 2009–2011 Tim Friede and Leonard Held
- 2012–2014 Lutz Edler and Mauro Gasparini
- 2015–2017 Dankmar Böhning and Marco Alfò
- 2020–2022 Matthias Schmid and Arne Bathke
- 2023 Arne Bathke, Monica Chiogna and Matthias Schmid
- 2024 Arne Bathke, Monica Chiogna and Jochem König

== Abstracting and indexing ==
According to the Journal Citation Reports, the journal has a 2024 impact factor of 1.8.
