= Gertrude Mary Cox =

American statistician (1900–1978)

- Born: January 13, 1900; Dayton, Iowa
- Died: October 17, 1978 (aged 78); Durham, North Carolina
- Education: Iowa State College; University of California at Berkeley
- Known for: First woman elected into the International Statistical Institute; president of the American Statistical Association; experimental statistics
- Awards: Fellow of the American Statistics Association (1944) Fellow of the Institute of Mathematical Statistics (1944) Member of the International Statistics Institute (1949) Honorary member of the Société Adolphe Quetelet (1954) Honorary fellow of the Royal Statistical Society (1959) University of North Carolina's Oliver Max Gardner Award (1959) International Award for Distinguished Service to Agriculture (awarded by Gamma Sigma Delta, 1960) Honorary Life Membership of the Biometric Society (1964) Member of the National Academy of Sciences (1975)
- Scientific career
- Fields: Statistics, Mathematics
- Workplaces: Professor of Statistics, North Carolina State University; Director of Statistics, Research Triangle Institute
- Thesis: "A Statistical Investigation of a Teacher's Ability as Indicated by the Success of His Students in Subsequent Courses" (1931)
- Academic advisors: George W. Snedecor

Gertrude Mary Cox (January 13, 1900 – October 17, 1978) was an American statistician and founder of the department of Experimental Statistics at North Carolina State University. She was later appointed director of both the Institute of Statistics of the Consolidated University of North Carolina and the Statistics Research Division of North Carolina State University. Her most important and influential research dealt with experimental design; In 1950 she published the book Experimental Designs, on the subject with W. G. Cochran, which became the major reference work on the design of experiments for statisticians for years afterwards. In 1949 Cox became the first woman elected into the International Statistical Institute and in 1956 was President of the American Statistical Association.

== Early life and education ==
Gertrude Cox was born in Dayton, Iowa on January 13, 1900. She studied at Perry High School in Perry, Iowa, graduating in 1918. At this time she decided to become a deaconess in the Methodist Church and worked towards that end. However, in 1925, she decided to continue her education at Iowa State College (which was renamed Iowa State University in 1959) in Ames where she studied mathematics and statistics and was awarded a B.S. in 1929 and a Master's degree in statistics in 1931.

From 1931 to 1933 Cox undertook graduate studies in psychological statistics at the University of California at Berkeley, then returned to Iowa State College to assist in establishing the new Statistical Laboratory. Here she worked on the design of experiments.

== Academic career ==
In 1939 Cox was appointed assistant professor of statistics at Iowa State College. In 1940 Cox was appointed professor of statistics at North Carolina State College (now North Carolina State University) at Raleigh. There she headed the new department of Experimental Statistics, the first female head of any department at this institution. In 1945 she became director of the Institute of Statistics of the Consolidated University of North Carolina, and the Statistics Research Division of the North Carolina State College which was run by William Gemmell Cochran. In the same year of 1945 Cox became the editor of Biometrics Bulletin and of Biometrics and she held this editorship for 10 years. When prolific statistician and eugenicist Ronald Fisher founded the International Biometric Society in 1947, Cox was one of the founding members.

In 1960 she took up her final post as Director of Statistics at the Research Triangle Institute in Durham, North Carolina. She held this post until she retired in 1965. After retirement, then worked as a consultant to promote the development of statistical programs in Egypt and Thailand.

== Book ==
In 1950 she published a joint work with William Cochran, Experimental Designs, which became the major reference work on the design of experiments for statisticians for years afterwards.

== Recognition ==
Cox has received many honors. In 1949, she became the first woman elected into the International Statistical Institute. In 1956, she was elected President of the American Statistical Association while in 1975 she was elected to the National Academy of Sciences. She was also a Fellow of the Institute of Mathematical Statistics.

The University of North Carolina system named her an O. Max Gardner Award recipient in 1959. North Carolina State University honored Cox by naming Cox Hall in her honor in 1970, and awarding her a Watauga Medal in 1977. Iowa State College in 1958 awarded her an honorary Doctorate of Science in statistics. The Caucus for Women in Statistics also established a Gertrude M. Cox Scholarship in 1989.
