= Herbert A. David =

American statistician (1925–2014)

Herbert Aron David (December 19, 1925 — July 14, 2014) was a German-born American mathematical statistician. He was distinguished professor emeritus of statistics at Iowa State University. He was a fellow of the American Statistical Association, the American Association for the Advancement of Science and the Institute of Mathematical Statistics. He was an elected member of the International Statistical Institute.

== Early life and education ==
David was born in Berlin, Germany in 1925. After the pogrom against Jews on Kristallnacht, his family fled Nazi Germany in 1939 and emigrated to Australia, where he continued his high school education. He earned his BS in mathematics in 1947 from Sydney University, and his PhD in statistics in 1953 University College London. His PhD thesis, Theory and Applications of Standard and Shortcut Tests in Analysis of Variance, was written under the tutelage of Herman Otto Hartley.

== Career ==
After completing his PhD, David returned to Australia and worked at the Commonwealth Scientific and Industrial Research Organisation (CSIRO) for two years, after which he joined the statistics department at Melbourne University as a senior lecturer. In 1957 David moved to the United States, and became professor of statistics at Virginia Polytechnic Institute until 1964 when he took a similar position at the University of North Carolina. In 1972 he joined Iowa State University as director of the statistics laboratory and chair of the department of statistics. He was professor of statistics until being named distinguished professor in 1980. In 1996, he retired and was awarded emeritus status.

David was author or co-author of over 100 publications. Two of his books, The Method of Paired Comparisons and Order Statistics, received positive reviews and are acknowledged to be the first comprehensive treatises of their subject matter and are considered classic texts. Later in his career, he became interested in and published on the history of statistics and origins of statistical terminology.

David was involved in service to his profession. He served as associate editor of Biometrics and of the Journal of the American Statistical Association. He was president of the Eastern North American Regions of the International Biometric Society and served on a number of committees for both the Institute of Mathematical Statistics and the American Statistical Association.

David was an elected fellow of the American Statistical Association, the American Association for the Advancement of Science, and the Institute of Mathematical Statistics, and was an elected member of the International Statistical Institute.

== Selected publications ==
=== Books ===
- David, H. A. (1963). The Method of Paired Comparisons. New York: Hafner Pub. Co. OCLC 2107241.
- David, Herbert Aron (1970). Order Statistics. New York: John Wiley & Sons. ISBN 978-0-471-19675-4.
- David, Herbert Aron, ed. (1978). Contributions to Survey Sampling and Applied Statistics: Papers in Honor of H. O. Hartley. doi:10.1016/C2013-0-10563-6. ISBN 978-0-12-204750-3.
- David, Herbert Aron; Moeschberger, Melvin L. (1978). Theory of Competing Risks. London: Macmillian. ISBN 978-0-85264-249-8.
- David, Herbert Aron; David, Herbert T. (1984). Statistics, an Appraisal: Proceedings of a Conference Marking the 50th Anniversary of the Statistical Laboratory, Iowa State University, Ames, Iowa, June 13-15, 1983. Iowa State University Press. ISBN 978-0-8138-1721-7.
- Armitage, P.; David, Herbert A. (1996). Advances in Biometry. Wiley. ISBN 978-0-471-16018-2.
- David, H.A.; Edwards, A.W.F. (2001). Annotated Readings in the History of Statistics. New York: Springer Science & Business Media. ISBN 978-0-387-98844-3.

=== Book chapters ===
- David, Herbert A.; Nagaraja, H. N. (1998). "Concomitants of Order Statistics". In Balakrishnan, N.; Rao, C. R. (eds.). Order Statistics: Theory & Methods. Amsterdam: Elsevier. pp. 487–513. doi:10.1016/S0169-7161(98)16020-0. ISBN 978-0-444-82091-4.
- David, H.A. (2015). "Order Statistics". International Encyclopedia of the Social & Behavioral Sciences. pp. 291–295. doi:10.1016/B978-0-08-097086-8.42065-9. ISBN 978-0-08-097087-5.

=== Journal articles ===
- David, H. A. (1995). "First (?) Occurrence of Common Terms in Mathematical Statistics". The American Statistician. 49 (2): 121–133. doi:10.1080/00031305.1995.10476129. ISSN 0003-1305.
- David, Herbert A. (2008). "The Beginnings of Randomization Tests". The American Statistician. 62: 70–72. doi:10.1198/000313008X269576.
- David, Herbert A. (2009). "A Historical Note on Zero Correlation and Independence". The American Statistician. 63 (2): 185–186. doi:10.1198/tast.2009.0034.
- David, Herbert A. (2009). "Karl Pearson—The Scientific Life in a Statistical Age by Theodore M. Porter: A Review". International Statistical Review. 77: 30–39. doi:10.1111/j.1751-5823.2009.00068.x.
- David, Herbert A. (2011). "Euler's Contributions to Mathematics Useful in Statistics". The American Statistician. 65: 37–42. doi:10.1198/tast.2011.09266.
