= Gerta Rücker =

German statistician

Gerta Rücker (born 1955) is a German statistician known for her expertise in meta-analysis, and in its application to studies of borderline personality disorder. She is a researcher in the Institute of Medical Biometry and Statistics at the University of Freiburg.

== Education and career ==
Rücker earned a diploma from the University of Erlangen–Nuremberg in 1982. She has been affiliated with the Institute of Medical Biometry and Statistics at the University of Freiburg since 2005, and earned her doctorate (Dr. rer. nat.) there in 2010. Her dissertation, Small-study Effects And Heterogeneity In Meta-analysis, was supervised by Martin Schumacher.

== Book ==
Rücker is the coauthor, with Guido Schwarzer and James R. Carpenter, of the book Meta-Analysis with R (Springer, 2015).
