= Jean-Dominique Lebreton =

Biomathematician

Jean-Dominique Lebreton (born February 19, 1950, in Saint-Étienne) is a biomathematician and a member of the French Academy of Sciences.

== Course ==
Jean-Dominique Lebreton obtained a university degree in Mathematics and Physics in 1969, then a Certificate of Master of Mathematics and Fundamental Applications and a Master of Computer Science in 1971.

He obtained his Diploma of Advanced Studies in Applied Biology in 1972, his Doctorate of Specialty in Lyon in 1974 and his Doctor of Science in 1981.

He was Assistant and then Assistant Professor at the University of Lyon before becoming Director of Research at the CNRS (CEFE) in Montpellier in 1990. Since 2014, he has been Director of Research Emeritus.

== Scientific work ==
Computer scientist and mathematician by training, naturalist by family tradition (younger brother of Philippe Lebreton), Jean-Dominique Lebreton is a biomathematician, mainly specialized in modelling in ecology and population dynamics.

Animal and plant population dynamics result from multiple mechanisms, such as feedback from populations on demographic performance or environmental variability. On an evolutionary scale, the diversification of demographic strategies raises many questions. Only modelling can therefore shed light on population dynamics, both at the ecological and evolutionary level. It is one of the main international actors in the development of population dynamics models.

First, it contributed to the launch of matrix models of population dynamics, producing formal sensitivity results and original stochastic generalizations, and applying these models to various vertebrates. He then demonstrated the key role of generation time in the diversity of demographic strategies and in the sensitivity of populations to demographic impacts.

Jean-Dominique Lebreton was then one of the driving forces behind the renewal of demographic capture-recapture methods. First, it was necessary to shift their focus from a focus on numbers to estimating individual flows and then to introduce ideas from generalized linear models, thus making it possible to analyze probabilities of survival according to age, gender or environment. His work, by bridging the gap between capture-recapture models and analysis of variance, has contributed to a real revolution, with a wide range of applications in evolutionary ecology and conservation biology. In recent years, he has been involved in the development of various types of models in which individuals move between several states, for example, to study dispersion and reproductive achievement. At the same time, he developed a long-term program on the Forézian population of Black-legged Kittiwake Chroicocephalus ridibundus, which highlighted the importance of dispersal behaviour in colonial birds in the face of spatial and temporal heterogeneity in the environments.

He has also relaunched theoretical and practical studies in the context of the biology of exploited populations. The integration of the dynamic and statistical models he developed, both by himself and in the team he created in Montpellier, has enabled him to shed light on the conservation and management of the populations subject to sampling:

- Hunting, especially ducks and geese;
- Involuntary removals, such as incidental catches of Albatrosses by longline fishing lines;
- Levies to limit numbers, with the elaboration for the Ministry of the Environment of a management plan for large cormorants wintering in France.

Both personally and through the team he created, but also through the development of collaborations with the French vertebrate population biology teams (LBBE Lyon, Paris VI, MNHN, Chizé, Strasbourg, Tour du Valat), he and various colleagues have contributed to the creation of a "French school" for the dynamics and biology of vertebrate populations.

The development and distribution of statistical software applications (Biomeco; U-CARE; SURGE, M-SURGE, E-SURGE) to support his team's research production have greatly contributed to this visibility.

As in his research administration activities, he was able to focus on "social utility" and collective construction in his international research and collaborations – there was a full choice in his generation. He has established long-term collaborations with colleagues such as J.D. Nichols and H. Caswell in the United States, B.J.T. Morgan in Great Britain, G. Gauthier in Canada.

The population dynamics workshops he has launched for more than 20 years, after similar workshops in statistical ecology, have brought together hundreds of colleagues, many of whom have remained in contact for data processing, visits to CEFE, or long-term collaborations. These workshops have been organized on several occasions in foreign countries (Great Britain, Canada, New Zealand, Spain, Morocco, United States...). He recently organized a workshop on "Matrix models for population management and conservation", from March 5 to 10, 2017 at the University of Florida (Gainesville).

He is regularly invited to international conferences in his field. Since 2009 he has been a Member of the Academia Europaea.

== Pedagogical activity ==
Jean-Dominique Lebreton has taught in the first, second and third cycles. He has also been asked for occasional courses and ongoing training.

== Other institutional responsibilities ==
- Deputy Director of CEFE, UMR 5175, December 2001 – December 2005
- Director of CEFE, UMR 5175, January 2006-December 2010
- Deputy Director of IFR 119 "Montpellier-Environnement-Biodiversity", 2006–2010
- Acting Director of this RFI, 2009–2010.
- Founder and Director of LABEX CeMEB, 2011–2013
- Secretary (1974–1980), and President (1981) of the Rhône-Alpes Ornithological Centre
- Member of the "Ecological Methodology" working group associated with the "Management of Renewable Natural Resources" committee, D.G.R.S.T., 1976–1979
- Secretary of the Scientific Council of the U.E.R. des Sciences de la Nature, University of Lyon I, 1977
- Member of the Board of Directors of the Société Française de Biométrie, 1979–1986; 1990 to date; Secretary, 1983–1986, and President, 1990–1992, of this company
- Member of the Board of the International Biometric Society, 2000–2003
- Member of the French Bird Certification Committee, 1983–1987
- Representative of the CNRS on the Scientific Council of the Camargue National Reserve (SNPN), 1995–95
- Alternate member, representative of the CNRS, on the Conseil National de la Chasse et de la Faune Sauvage (CNCFS), 1996–
- Member of the Scientific Council of the National Office for Hunting and Wildlife (ONCFS), 1996–96
- Scientific Advisor, Tour du Valat Foundation, 1990–
- Member of the Scientific Committee of the URA CNRS 367, "Écologie des Eaux Douces", 1990–1993
- Member of the Scientific Committee of the Centre d'Études Biologiques de Chizé, 1998–2001
- Chairman of various UMR evaluation committees.

== Distinctions ==
- First prize, first researcher's film festival, Nancy, March 1996, "Glaros, Biologie d'une population de Mouettes rieuses". Video Film (26''), L'Esplanade Saint-Étienne Vidéo. Saint-Étienne. (Director: J.C. PARAYRE, Scientific Advisor, J.-D. LEBRETON).
- "Visiting Professor", University of Kent (Canterbury, Great Britain), 1996–2001.
- CNRS Silver medal, 1990.
- Chevalier in the Ordre national du Mérite, on the proposal of the Minister of Regional Planning and the Environment, November 1998
- Member of the French Academy of sciences (elected on 28 November 2005).
- Grand Prize of the French Society of Ecology and Evolution.

== Few Bibliographic references ==
- Lebreton, J.-D., Burnham, K. P., Clobert, J. & Anderson, D. R. Modeling survival and testing biological hypotheses using marked animals: a unified approach with case studies. Ecological Monographs, 1992, 62: 67–118. (4028 citations)
- Lebreton, J.-D. & Pradel, R. Multistate recapture models: modelling incomplete individual histories. Journal of Applied Statistics. 2002, 29: 353–369. (311 citations)
- Lebreton, J.-D., Nichols, J.D., Barker, R.J. Pradel, R. & Spendelow, J.A. Modeling individual animal histories with multistate capture-recapture models. Advances in Ecological Research, 2009, 41: 87–173. (186 citations)
- Choquet, R., Lebreton, J.-D., Gimenez, O., Reboulet A.-M., Pradel, R. -U-CARE: Utilities for performing goodness of fit tests and manipulating CApture-REcapture data. Ecography, 2009, 32: 1071–1074. (449 citations)
- Lebreton, J.-D. & Gimenez O. Detecting and estimating Density-Dependence in wildlife populations. Journal of Wildlife Management, 2013, 77: 12–23 (Published on line27 AUG 2012 | DOI: 10.1002/jwmg.425) (45 citations)
- Niel, C. & Lebreton, J.-D. Using demographic invariants to detect overharvested bird populations from incomplete data. Conservation Biology, 2005, 19: 826–835. (125 citations)
- Lebreton J.-D. Dynamical and Statistical models for exploited populations. Australian and New-Zealand Journal of Statistics, 2005, 47: 49–63. (103 citations)
- Henaux, V., Bregnballe, T. & Lebreton, J.-D. Dispersal and recruitment during population growth in a colonial bird, the Great Cormorant. Journal of Avian Biology, 2007, 38: 44–57. (90 citations)
- Lebreton, J.-D. Demographic models for subdivided populations: the renewal equation approach. Theoretical Population Biology, 1996, 49: 291–313. (113 citations)
