= Freie Waldorfschule Wetterau =

- An der Birkenkaute; Bad Nauheim, Hesse, 61231; Germany

Information
- Type: Private, Waldorf school
- Established: 20th century
- Administrator: Fr. Büchel, Hr. Büsing, Hr. Mos
- Faculty: 60
- Enrollment: 440
- Student to teacher ratio: 7.3 :1
- Website: waldorfschule-wetterau.de

The Freie Waldorfschule Wetterau is a private Waldorf school located in Bad Nauheim, Germany.

The Freie Waldorfschule Wetterau is a general-education school starting with class 1, with an officially recognised senior high school until the Abitur in class 13 (diploma from German secondary school qualifying for university admission or matriculation). The school is based on the Waldorf education. Parents and teachers are the financiers of the school. Therefore, the parents are highly integrated into all themes concerning the school.

During summer 2002 the Varieté AG was founded. Once a year they have a huge show. The very first performance was in July 2003.

In 2021, the Freie Waldorfschule Wetterau had around 440 students taught by about 60 teachers.

== Curriculum ==
- The school specialises in music, all kinds of art, Eurhythmy and gardening.
- English and French starting with class 1.
- Several projects in lower grade classes like building a house or organic farming in the school's own garden.
- Choir and orchestra of junior high school and senior high school for all pupils.
- Various internships:
  - 9th class: Farming and business internship
  - 10th class: surveying
  - 11th class: social internship
  - 12th class: art historical school trip
- Drama in 6th, 8th and 12th class
- Partnership between 1st and 9th class,
- Zirkus-AG (circus consortium) and Varieté-AG (AG=consortium)
