= Jeanine Houwing-Duistermaat =

Dutch biostatistician and epidemiologist (*1968)

- Born: 1968 (age 57–58); Zwolle
- Scientific career
- Thesis: Statistical Methods for Family Data (1997)
- Doctoral advisor: Hans van Houwelingen

Jeanne "Jeanine" Jacobine Houwing-Duistermaat (born 1968) is a Dutch biostatistician and genetic epidemiologist, with broad interests including family data, omics, and continuum data. She is a professor of applied statistics at the Eindhoven University of Technology.

== Education and career ==
Houwing-Duistermaat was born in 1968 in Zwolle. She completed a Ph.D. in 1997 at Leiden University, with the dissertation Statistical Methods for Family Data, promoted by Hans van Houwelingen.

After postdoctoral research and an assistant professorship at the Erasmus MC, a medical center affiliated with Erasmus University Rotterdam, she returned to Leiden University as Professor of Statistical Genetics in 2010. She moved to the University of Leeds in the UK as Professor of Data Analytics and Statistics in 2015, to the University of Bologna in Italy as Professor of Statistics in 2020, and to Radboud University Nijmegen as Professor of Statistics in 2022. She took her present position at the Eindhoven University of Technology in 2025.

== Recognition ==
Houwing-Duistermaat was elected to the Royal Netherlands Academy of Arts and Sciences in 2024.
