= Julian Dudda =

German footballer

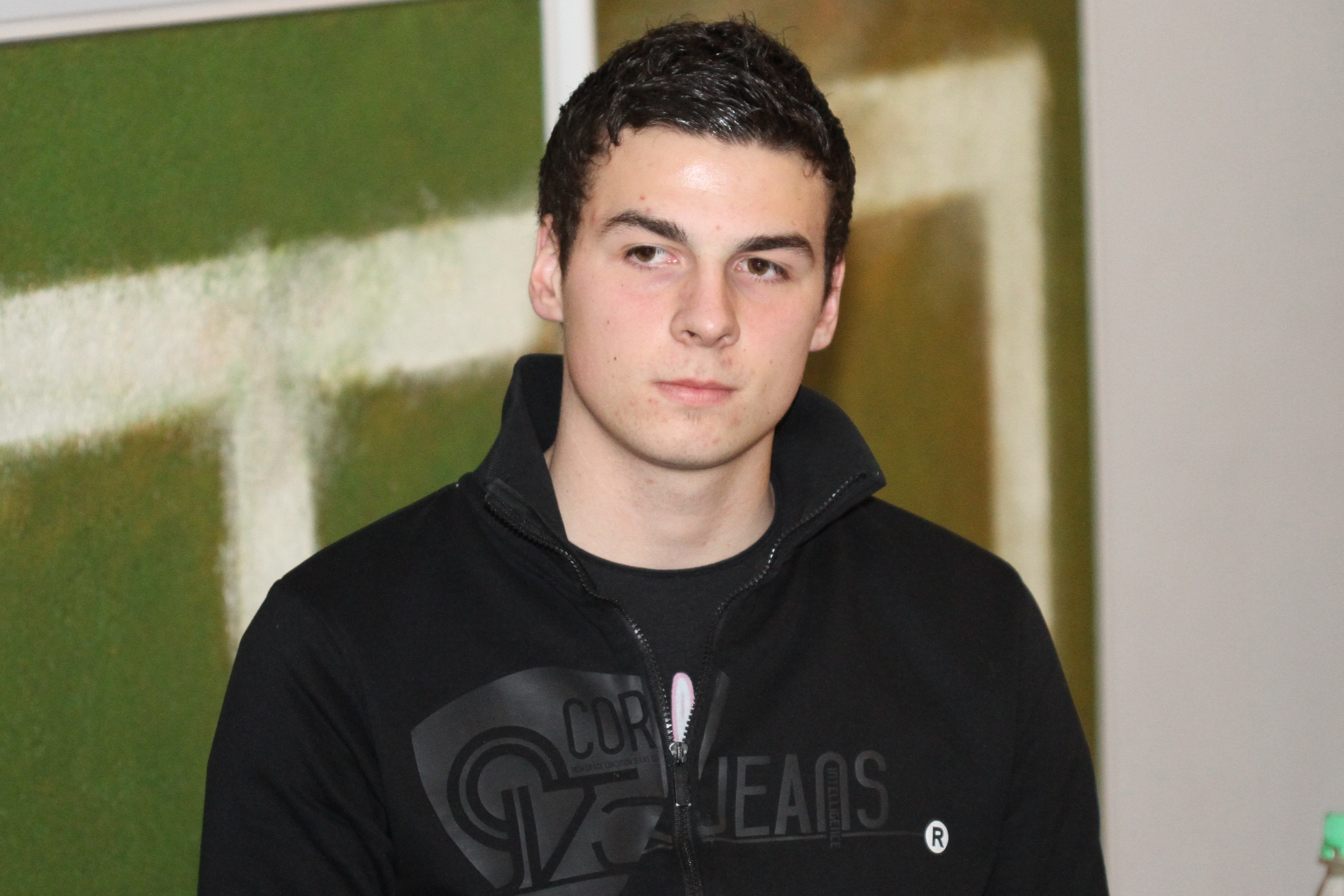
- Dudda in 2010

Personal information
- Date of birth: 8 April 1993 (age 33)
- Place of birth: Bad Nauheim, Germany
- Height: 1.83 m (6 ft 0 in)
- Position: Centre-back

Team information
- Current team: Türk Gücü Friedberg
- Number: 20

Youth career
- JSG Wöllstadt
- JSG Echzell
- TSG Wölfersheim
- FSV Frankfurt
- 2007–2011: Eintracht Frankfurt

Senior career*
Years	Team	Apps	(Gls)
2011–2013	Eintracht Frankfurt	1	(0)
2013–2015	Werder Bremen II	18	(0)
2013–2015	Werder Bremen III	18	(4)
2015–2016	Kickers Offenbach	7	(0)
2016–2017	Sportfreunde Siegen	12	(0)
2017–2019	Hessen Dreieich	8	(2)
2019–	Türk Gücü Friedberg	64	(5)

International career
2010–2011	Germany U18	2	(0)
2011	Germany U19	1	(0)
- * Club domestic league appearances and goals as of 19 November 2022

Julian Dudda (born 8 April 1993) is a German footballer who plays as a centre-back for Hessenliga side Türk Gücü Friedberg.

== Club career ==
Dudda played for youth teams such as JSG Wöllstadt, JSG Echzell, TSG Wölfersheim and FSV Frankfurt.

He joined Eintracht Frankfurt in summer 2007 aged 14. In the 2009–10 season, he won the Under 17 Bundesliga championship with Eintracht Frankfurt. In the 2010–11 season, he changed to Frankfurt's under-19 team, who plays in the Under 19 Bundesliga South/Southwest.

Dudda made his Bundesliga debut on 7 May 2011 in a 2–0 loss to 1. FC Köln. At that time, he was the seventh youngest Bundesliga player ever. On 12 May 2011, he signed a professional contract with Eintracht Frankfurt.

== International career ==
Dudda made his debut for the German under-18 team on 10 October 2010 in a 1–0 victory against Ukraine. On 24 March 2011, in his second game for the Germans, he came as substitute in the 46th minute for Antonio Rüdiger.
