= Lisa Gnadl =

German politician (born 1981)

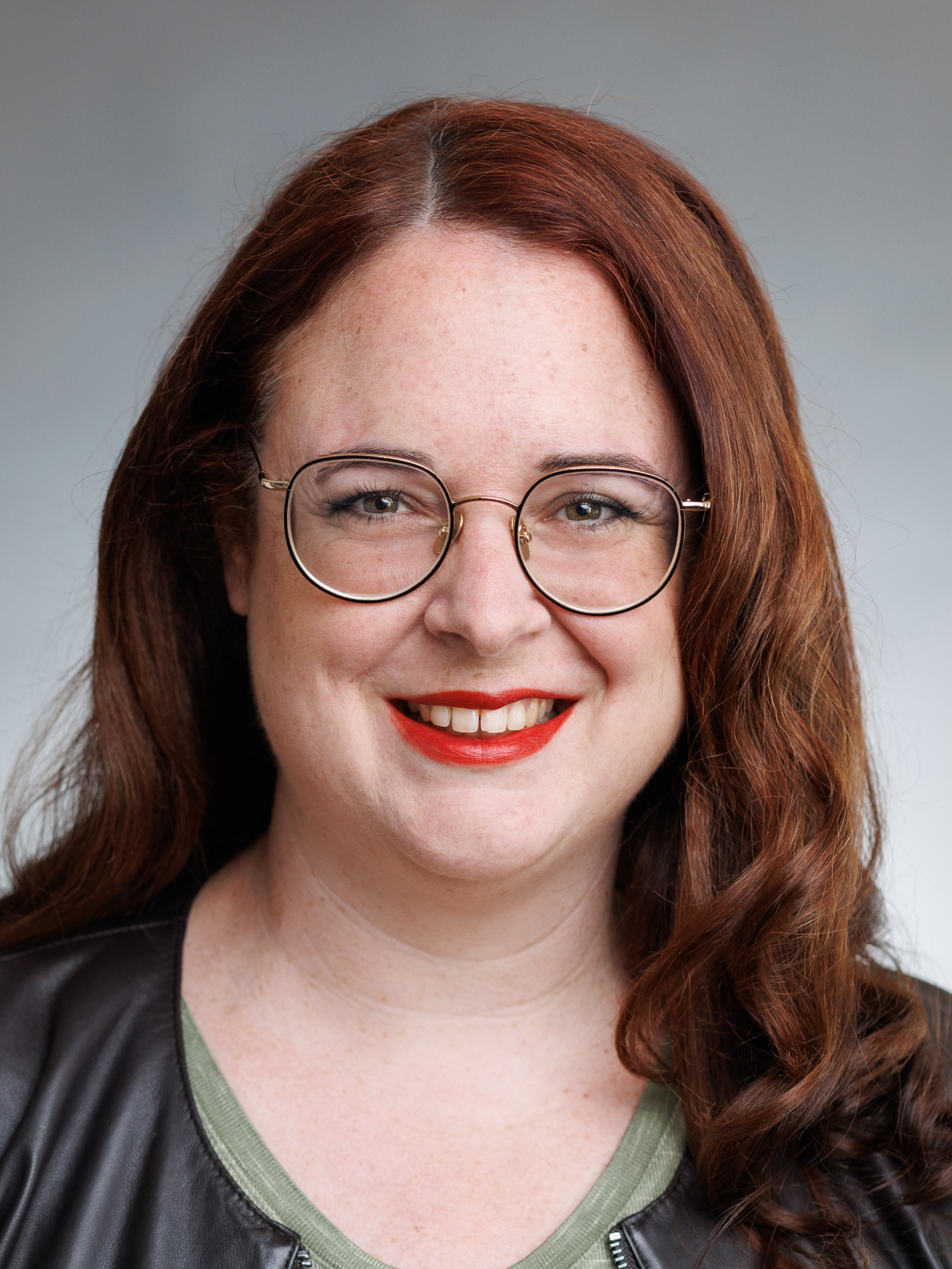
- Gnadl in 2022

Member of the Landtag of Hesse
- Incumbent
- Assumed office 5 April 2008

Personal details
- Born: 22 May 1981 (age 45) Bad Nauheim, West Germany
- Party: Social Democratic Party (since 1997)

Lisa Gnadl (born 22 May 1981 in Bad Nauheim) is a German politician serving as a member of the Landtag of Hesse since 2008. She has served as chairwoman of the Social Democratic Party in Wetterau since 2017.
