= 811 Nauheima =

Main-belt asteroid

Discovery
- Discovered by: Max Wolf
- Discovery site: Heidelberg Observatory
- Discovery date: 8 September 1915

Designations
- Alternative designations: 1915 XR

Orbital characteristics
- Epoch 31 July 2016 (JD 2457600.5)
- Uncertainty parameter 0
- Observation arc: 100.61 yr (36747 d)
- Aphelion: 3.1094 AU (465.16 Gm)
- Perihelion: 2.6844 AU (401.58 Gm)
- Semi-major axis: 2.8969 AU (433.37 Gm)
- Eccentricity: 0.073362
- Orbital period (sidereal): 4.93 yr (1800.9 d)
- Mean anomaly: 196.685°
- Mean motion: 0° 11^{m} 59.64^{s} / day
- Inclination: 3.1384°
- Longitude of ascending node: 130.915°
- Argument of perihelion: 177.646°

Physical characteristics
- Synodic rotation period: 4.0011 h (0.16671 d)
- Absolute magnitude (H): 10.7

811 Nauheima is a minor planet orbiting the Sun. It was named after Bad Nauheim, a spa town in western Germany.
