= J. W. Hopkins =

Canadian bioscientist and statistician

John William Hopkins (1908–1989, published as J. W. Hopkins) was a Canadian bioscientist and statistician who worked for many years for the National Research Council Canada.

== Education and career ==
Hopkins initially studied the biochemistry of cereals, especially focusing on rust-resistant wheat. He obtained a master's degree in 1931 from the University of Alberta, with the thesis Gluten quality and the effect of dilution of wheat flours with starch.

His interest in statistics was attracted by a 1925 book by Ronald Fisher, Statistical Methods for Research Workers. He worked for two years in England as a statistician at Rothamsted Research under Fisher, while also holding a position with the National Research Council Canada as a research assistant and junior research biologist for grain research. In 1933, Fisher moved from Rothamsted to University College London to head a new Department of Eugenics, and in 1934 Hopkins completed a Ph.D. there.

Subsequently, in Canada at the National Research Council, he established a laboratory for biometrics. During World War II, he worked on operations research for the Royal Canadian Air Force. When the International Biometric Society was founded in 1947, he became its first treasurer. He retired in 1973.

== Recognition ==
Hopkins was made a Member of the Order of the British Empire (MBE) for his wartime service.

He was elected as a Fellow of the American Statistical Association, in the 1948 class of fellows. He was also a Fellow of the Royal Society of Canada (FRSC), a Fellow of the Royal Statistical Society (FRSS), and an Elected Member of the International Statistical Institute. In 1981, the Statistical Society of Canada named him as an honorary member.

He was one of the inaugural recipients of the Centenary Medal of the Royal Society of Canada, in 1982.
