= 32nd Cavalry Regiment (United States) =

Cavalry regiment of the United States Army

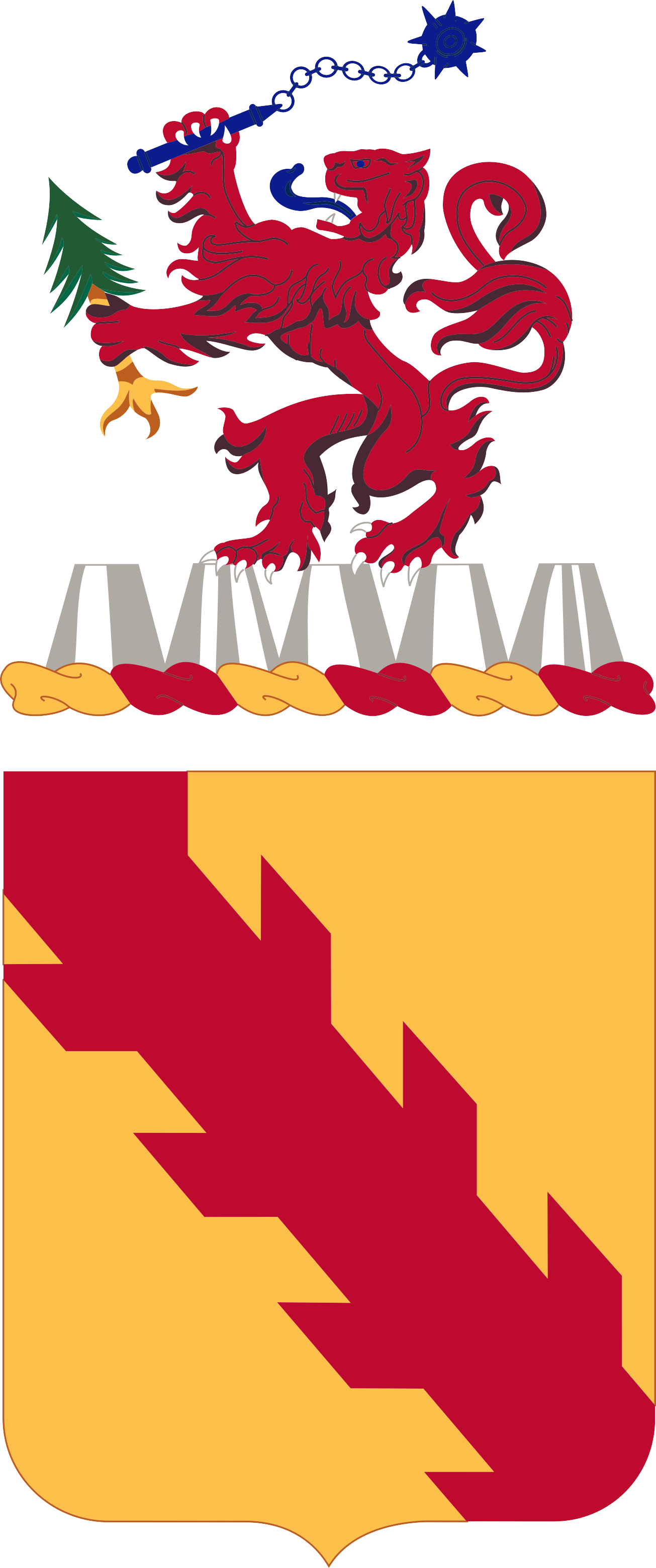
- Coat of arms
- Active: 1941–2000; 2005–present
- Country: United States
- Branch: United States Army
- Type: Cavalry
- Size: Regiment
- Regimental Headquarters: Fort Campbell, Kentucky
- Motto: Victory or Death
- Facings: Yellow
- Engagements: World War II; Normandy; Northern France; Rhineland; Ardennes-Alsace; Central Europe; Southwest Asia; Defense of Saudi Arabia; Liberation and Defense of Kuwait; Cease-Fire; War on terrorism; Iraqi Surge

Commanders
- Notable commanders: John Bahnsen

Insignia
- Distinctive unit insignia

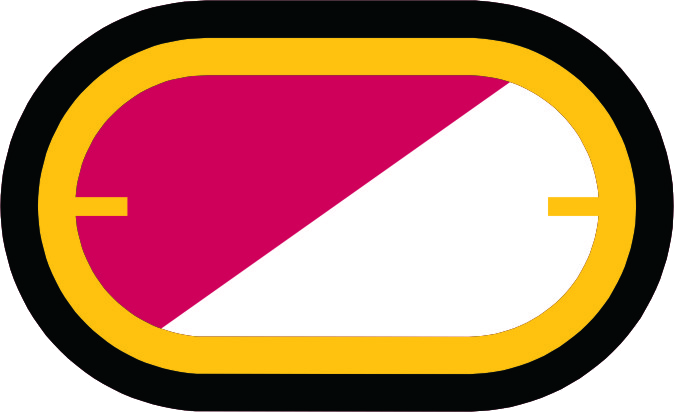
- 1st Squadron Background Trimming

The 32nd Cavalry Regiment is a cavalry formation of the United States Army. From 1941 to 2000, it was an armor formation.

== History ==
The 32nd Armor Regiment was activated 15 April 1941 at Camp Beauregard, Louisiana as the 2nd Armored Regiment and assigned to the 3rd Armored Division. This title designation did not last long as the unit was quickly redesignated less than a month later on 8 May 1941 as the 32nd Armor Regiment. The 32nd Armor along with the 33rd Armor were the only two of the six armor regiments (the others belonging to the 1st and 2nd Armored Divisions) to have ever been deployed in full regimental formation (during World War II.) All other armor units were deployed at the battalion level. The 32nd Armor Regiment then moved to Fort Polk, Louisiana on 14 June 1941. When the unit arrived Fort Polk was still not completed but nonetheless it was designated as the training base for the 3rd Armored Division. The Battalion received the bulk of its men who underwent basic training, began field training and learned to operate their tanks.

=== World War II ===
The 32nd was assigned to the 3rd Armored Division.The unit moved to Normandy in mid June 1944. On 29 June 1944, the regiment entered combat as part of the 3rd Armored Division's Combat Command A at Villiers-Fossard. The regiment fought on until 24 April 1945. During their time in action the unit assisted in the liberation of France and Belgium and breaking through the Siegfried Line. It experienced heavy combat in the Hurtgen Forest and The Battle of the Bulge. The regiment earned two Distinguished Unit Citations and twice received the Meritorious Service Unit Plaque for their service.

=== Cold War ===
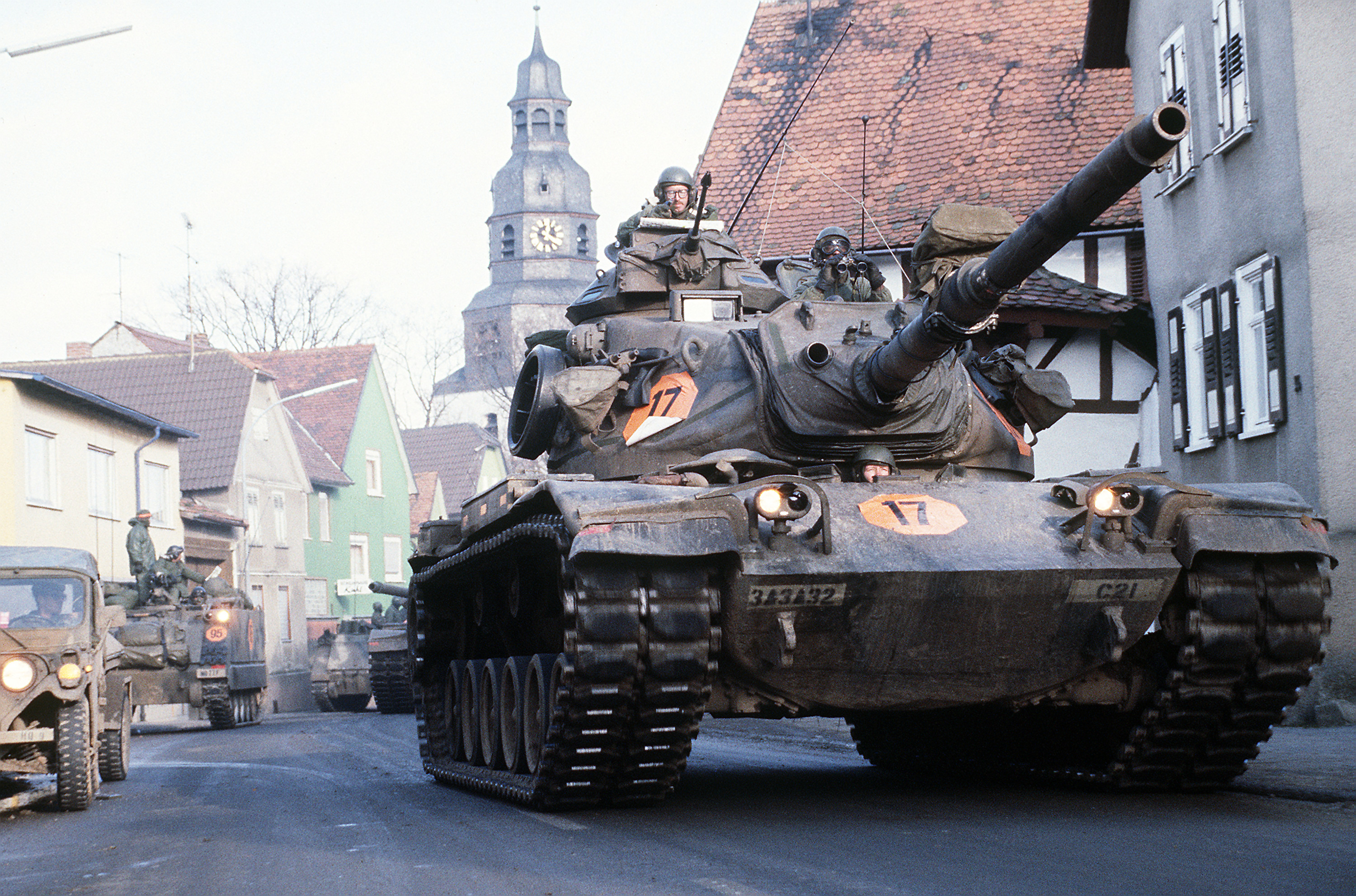
M60A3 tank of 3rd Battalion at Langgöns, Germany, in January 1985

Following the end of the Second World War, the 32nd Armor Regiment stood down along with the rest of the 3rd Armored Division on 10 November 1945. As Cold War tensions grew, the regiment was reactivated on 15 July 1947. Battalions of the regiment were stationed with United States Army Europe in West Germany and was tasked with deterring any Soviet advance through the Fulda Gap. The 1st Battalion was in Germany after the Korean War ended, and was joined by 3rd Battalion after being dispatched from Fort Stewart, Georgia in the early 1960s.

Locations varied with divisional attachments. Examples in the 1960s: 1st Battalion and 3rd Battalion with the 3rd Brigade, 3rd Armored Division, in Friedberg; 5th Battalion with the 24th Infantry Division in Munich.

Meanwhile, the 2nd Battalion was in Hawaii during the 1950s.

=== Southwest Asia ===
The 32nd Armor Regiment also played an important role in Southwest Asia as part of the 3rd Armored Division. Following the end of hostilities in the Persian Gulf, the 32nd Armor Regiment stood down along with the rest of the 3rd Armored Division at Fort Knox, KY, on 17 October 1992 with personnel and equipment being transferred to the 2nd Battalion, 12th Cavalry Regiment. 3/32 Armor was part of the 1st Cavalry Division out of Fort Hood, TX during Desert Shield/Desert Storm.

=== Reactivation as cavalry ===
The 1st Battalion was reactivated 16 April 1995 at Fort Lewis, Washington using personnel and equipment from the 5th Battalion, 77th Armor Regiment, 1st Armored Division, recently transferred from Mannheim, Germany in 1994. The battalion then became a subordinate unit of the 2nd Infantry Division.

The 1st Battalion (the last active unit of the 32nd Armor Regiment) was inactivated on 15 September 2000 at Fort Lewis, Washington with personnel and equipment being transferred to the 1st Squadron, 14th Cavalry Regiment.

On 10 August 2005 the 1st Squadron, 32nd Cavalry Regiment was activated as part of the 1st Brigade Combat Team (Bastogne), 101st Airborne Division (Air Assault) at Fort Campbell, Kentucky. This new cavalry regiment inherited and continued the lineage and honors (including distinctive unit insignia) of the 32nd Armor Regiment.

=== War on terrorism ===
On 23 September 2005, the 1st Squadron, 32nd Cavalry (Reconnaissance, Surveillance, and Target Acquisition (RSTA)) deployed to Iraq for a tour in support of Operation Iraq Freedom. The unit conducted a relief in place with four battalions of the 278th Armored Cavalry Regiment and assumed responsibility for over 18,000 square kilometers of eastern Diyala Province along the Iranian border. There, the Bandits partnered with and validated two Iraqi Brigades, fought Al-Qaeda in Iraq operatives and conducted counter-insurgency operations against insurgent networks attempting to destabilize the new Iraqi government. Between 20 May 2006 and 20 July 2006, Task Force Bandit, consisting of 1–32 Cavalry, elements of C/1-68 Armor and A/3-29 Field Artillery and with aviation support from 3rd, 4th and 7th Battalions, 101st Aviation,3/978 MP CO conducted a series of operations against Al-Qaeda and Ansar Al-Sunna safe areas within the isolated terrain along the Diyala River of the Muqdadiyah Qa'da. These operations denied the enemy sanctuary, rescued over twenty kidnapped civilians, eliminated strategic caches, destroyed vehicle-borne improvised explosive factories and disrupted senior Al-Qaeda and Ansar Al-Sunna leadership and planning. During this deployment, troopers of the 1st Squadron, 32nd Cavalry Regiment (RSTA) earned four Bronze Star Medals for Valor and 29 Army Commendation Medals for Valor. On 24 August 2006, 1st Squadron, 32nd Cavalry transitioned authority to 2nd Squadron, 9th Cavalry and returned to Fort Campbell, Kentucky to prepare for their next deployment.

On 21 September 2007, the 1st Squadron, 32nd Cavalry once again departed Fort Campbell, again bound for eastern Diyala Province, Iraq for a 15-month tour as a part of the Iraqi Surge. Once in Iraq, the squadron relieved 5th Squadron, 73rd Cavalry and continued operations in Diyala, while planning for a move to FOB Paliwoda, located in southern Salah ad Din Province. While the majority of the squadron conducted their move to FOB Paliwoda and relieved 3rd Squadron, 8th Cavalry, C Troop remained in Diyala to turn over the area of operations to the 2nd Squadron, 3rd Armored Cavalry Regiment. During the next twelve months in Salah ad Din Province, 1–32 Cavalry set up numerous Sons of Iraq groups to assist in securing the local population, trained members of the Iraqi Army and National Police and conducted numerous targeted air assault raids against high-value targets throughout their area of operations. In November 2008, the squadron returned to Fort Campbell to once again train and prepare for another deployment, this time to Afghanistan.

April 2010, Task Force (TF) Bandit, deployed to eastern Afghanistan in support of Operation Enduring Freedom and executed counterinsurgency operations in the remote provinces of Nuristan and Kunar. TF Bandit established security through offensive operations and the judicious application of joint direct and indirect fires, and improved governance and security by enabling local leaders and Afghan National Security Forces. By mid-July, TF Bandit had made clear improvements in security, governance and development in Naray and Ghaziabad Districts by expanding local government and shifting from contractor-centric to community-focused development. In July 2010, insurgent forces occupied the village of Barg-e Matal, an isolated but politically significant village in the northern region of TF Bandit's operational environment (OE) accessible only by air.

On 26 July 2010, TF Bandit conducted Operation AZMARAY FURY, a combined air assault, augmented with Soldiers from 1st and 2nd Battalion, 327th Infantry Regiments, Afghan National Security Forces elements and other enablers in order to secure the population of Barg-e Matal. ANSF and TF Bandit seized the objective and conducted follow-on missions in the Mandigal Valley including the clearance of the villages of Badmuk and Bachancha. On 18 September 2010, TF Bandit enabled the safe completion of parliamentary elections by defending polling sites, securing a main supply route (MSR) and pursuing insurgents attempting to disrupt the electoral process.

On 8 February 2011, TF Bandit conducted a major offensive operation code named Northern Avalanche. Augmented with Coalition and Afghan National Security Forces elements air assaulted and cleared to disrupt anti-Afghan forces within major valleys located in the southern portion in TF Bandit OE and allow ANSF to secure MSR south of Ghaziabad District Center. ANSF and TF Bandit decisively disrupted a major insurgent network, defeated defending enemy forces, and secured their objectives. During OEF 10-11 TF Bandit took part in 327 enemy engagements, completed 661 indirect fire missions involving 5,024 projectiles and was awarded 32 Purple Hearts, 13 valor awards and 205 combat badges. The TF Bandit also devoted 50 projects and $3 million toward development, and treated over 3,000 local national patients

In November 2012, the 1st Squadron, 32nd Cavalry Regiment deployed in support of Operation Enduring Freedom as Security Force Advise and Assist Teams, SFAAT, under the command of 1st Brigade Combat Team, Bastogne and 101st Airborne Division (Air Assault).

== Popular culture ==
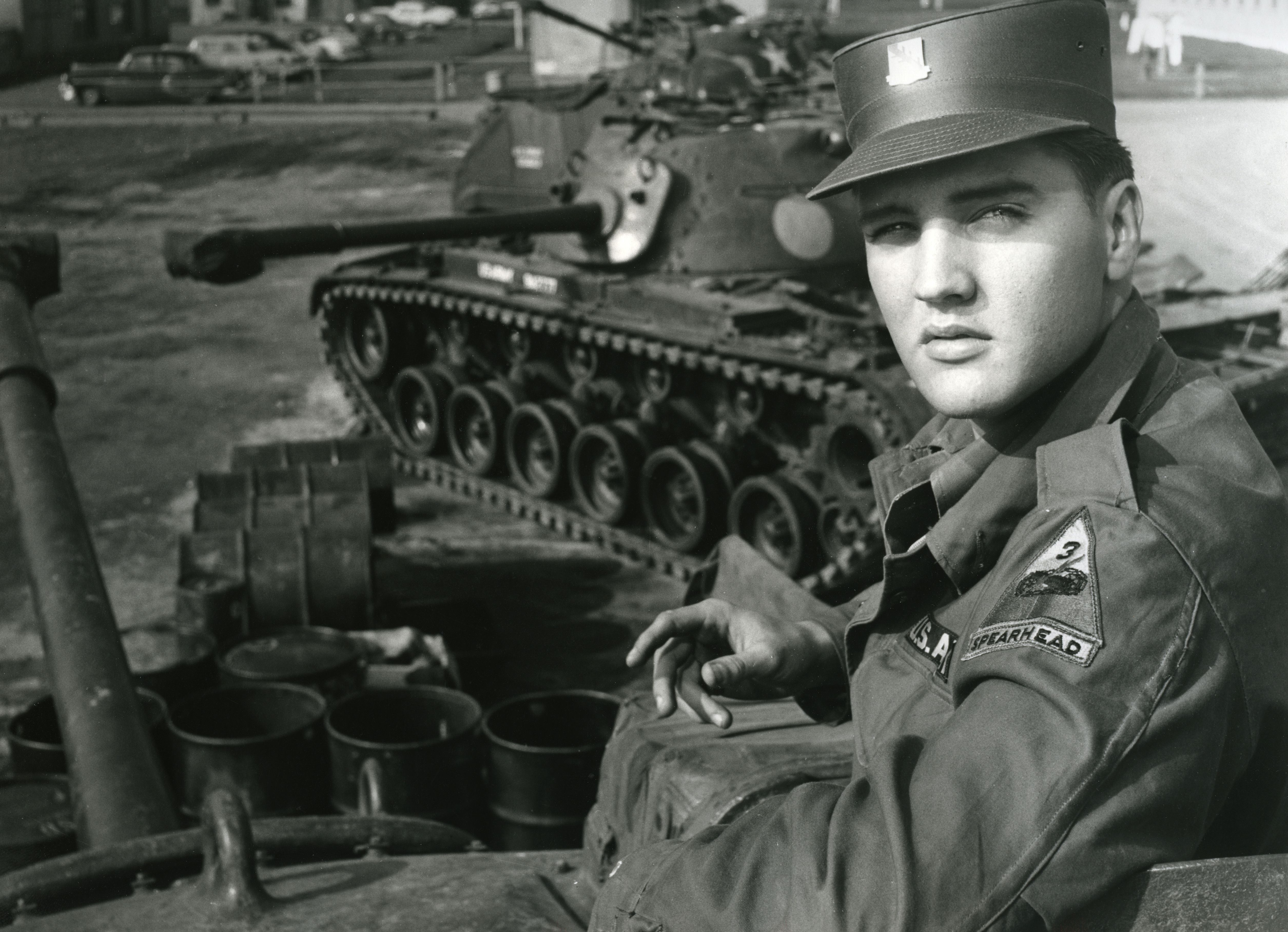
Elvis Presley in uniform, 1958

From 1958 to 1960 Elvis Presley served as an armor intelligence specialist with the 1st Medium Tank Battalion at Ray Barracks, Germany. One of Presley's Army uniforms is on display at the Patton Museum of Cavalry and Armor at Ft. Knox, Kentucky, in a special exhibit called "Sgt. Presley, Citizen Soldier."

Axl Rose, the lead singer of Guns N' Roses, has a tattoo of the 32nd Armor regimental crest on his left arm, as a reference to unit veteran Elvis Presley, though Rose has never served in any military unit. Similarly, in the movie Ferris Bueller's Day Off, Ferris sometimes wears the crest on a black beret. Black berets were once worn by 3rd Armored Division tank crewmen. The 32nd Armor Regiment was part of the 3rd Armored Division.

== See also ==
- List of armored and cavalry regiments of the United States Army
- U.S. Army Regimental System
