= Nauheim bath =

In water bubbled with carbon dioxide

A Nauheim bath is a special bath which is taken in water through which carbon dioxide is bubbled. Systematic exercises are taken in this bath for the treatment of cardiac conditions. The procedure is named after the town of Bad Nauheim, Germany. which is known for its natural waters and thermals.
