= Dankeskirche, Bad Nauheim =

Coordinates: 50.364806°N 8.741542°E

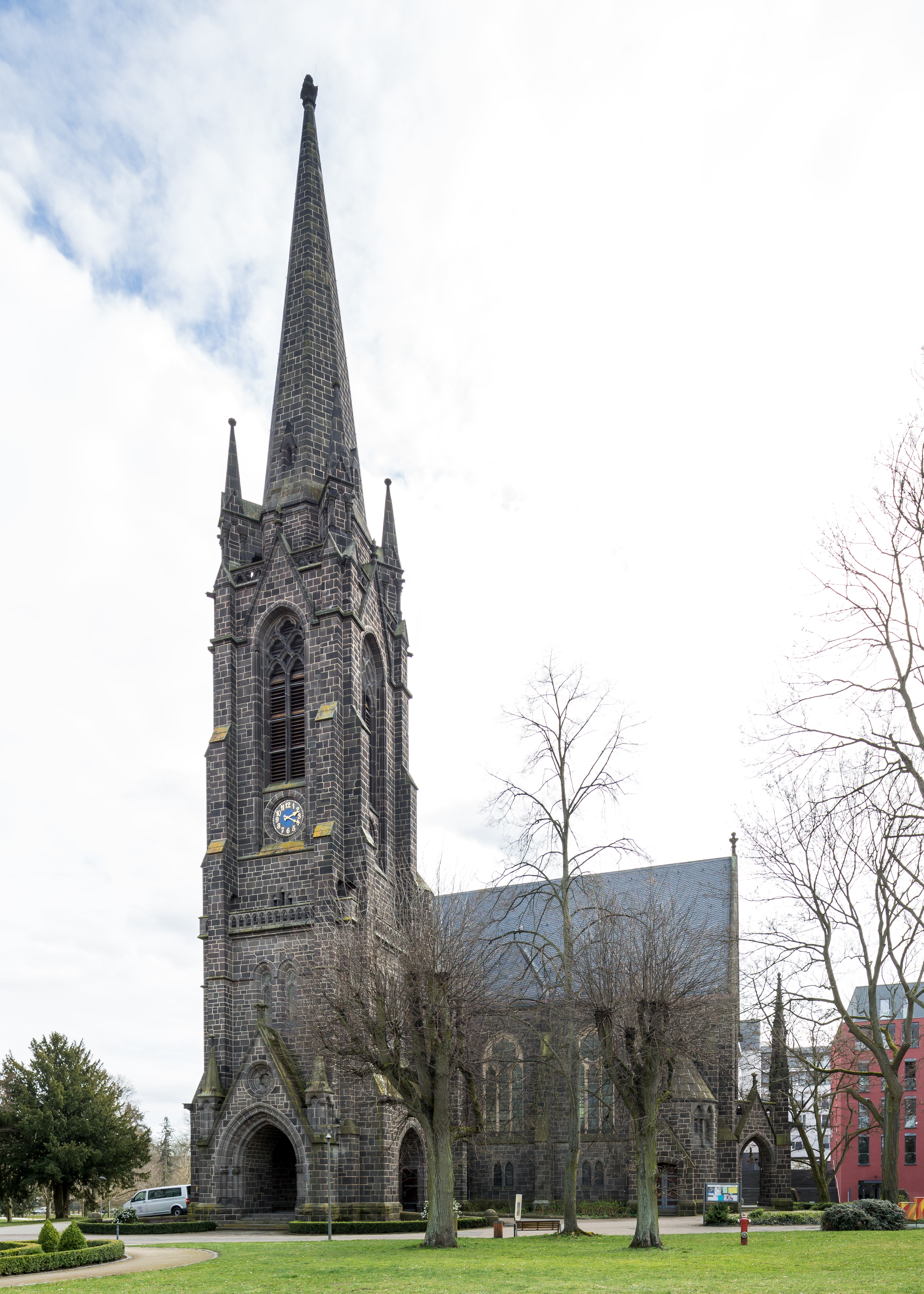
Dankeskirche from northwest, 2014

The Dankeskirche (Church of Thanks) is the central Protestant church in Bad Nauheim. It was planned from 1893, located near the spa facilities. Built in Gothic-revival style to a design by Ludwig Hofmann, it was opened in 1906. The church was made with Londorf basalt, a type of volcanic rock.

The first organ was built by Eberhard Friedrich Walcker. The church features a baptismal font from the 12th century, which was moved from the congregation's former church. The church also features stained glass with depictions of biblical meaning.
