= Konitzky Foundation =

Building in Bad Nauheim, Germany and former charitable foundation

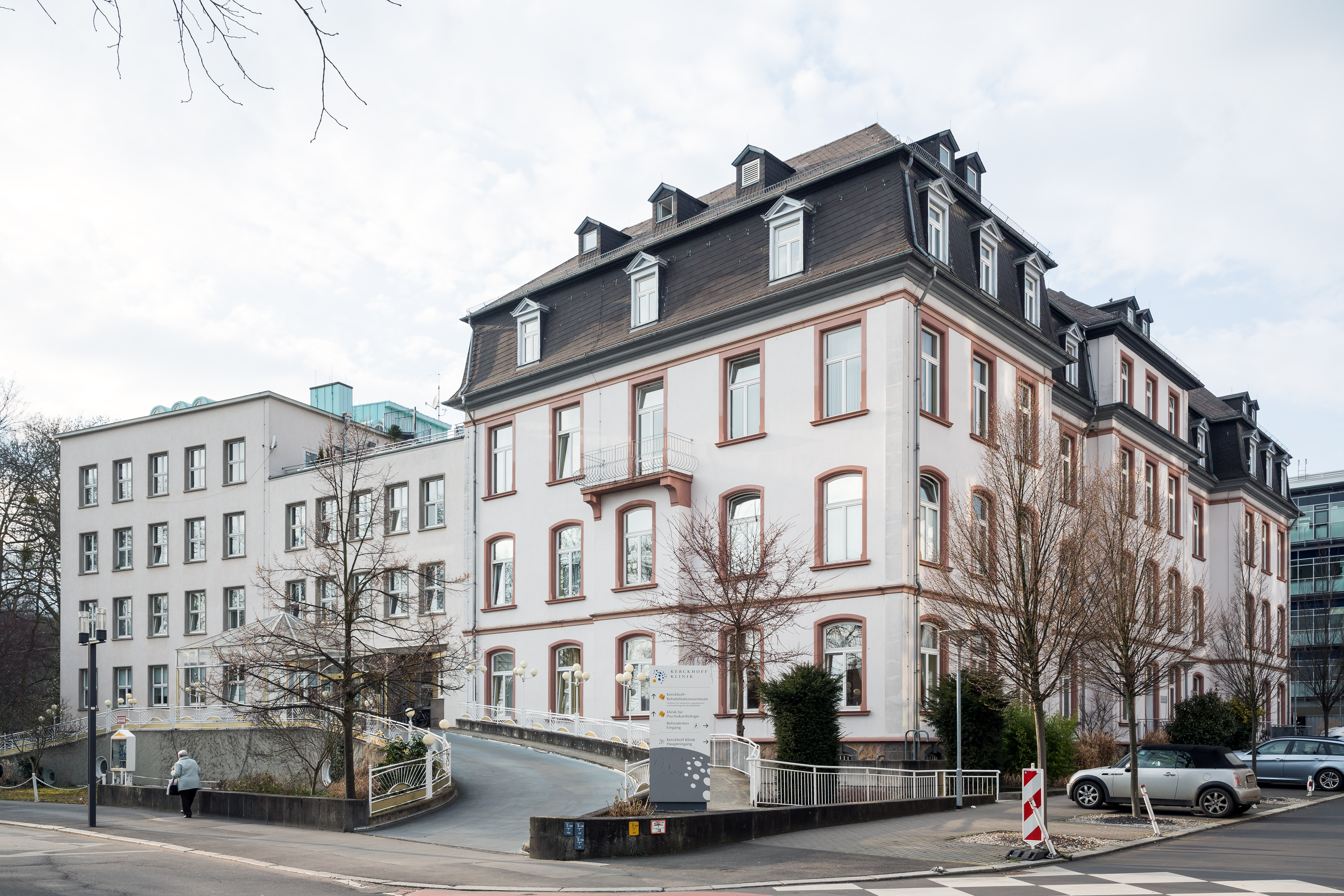
Former building of the Konitzky Foundation

The Konitzky Foundation (German: Konitzky-Stift) was a German charitable foundation and hospital in Bad Nauheim, a world-famous resort, noted for its salt springs, which are used to treat heart and nervous system diseases. It was founded in 1896 by a donation from Frances Theodora Konitzky (née de Voss), the Belgian-born widow of a former patient at Bad Nauheim, to provide care for patients who lacked the economic means to pay for the treatment offered in Bad Nauheim. The foundation was administered by the city of Bad Nauheim. The hospital building is located in Ludwigstraße 41, directly adjacent to the Kurpark. The oldest part of the building, the current three-storey east wing, was built 1896–1897. The building was extended between 1931 and 1935 and modified several times. The hospital eventually evolved into a regular hospital and is now the rehabilitation centre of the Kerckhoff Clinic, which is affiliated with the Max Planck Institute for Heart and Lung Research.
