= Journal of Agricultural, Biological and Environmental Statistics =

- Discipline: Statistics
- Language: English
- Edited by: Jorge Mateu

Publication details
- History: 1996–present
- Publisher: Springer Science+Business Media
- Frequency: Quarterly
- Impact factor: 1.1 (2024)

Standard abbreviations
- ISO 4: J. Agric. Biol. Environ. Stat.

Indexing
- ISSN: 1085-7117 (print); 1537-2693 (web)

Links
- Journal homepage; Online archive; IBS Homepage; ASA Journals Homepage

Journal of Agricultural, Biological and Environmental Statistics (JABES) is a peer-reviewed academic journal published by Springer Science+Business Media. It is a joint publication of the International Biometric Society and the American Statistical Association. The journal publishes four issues a year composed of articles that introduce new statistical methods to solve practical problems in the agricultural sciences, the biological sciences, and the environmental sciences.

== Abstracting and indexing ==
Journal of Agricultural, Biological and Environmental Statistics is abstracted and indexed in the Journal Citation Reports, Mathematical Reviews, Research Papers in Economics, SCImago Journal Rank, Scopus, Science Citation Index, Zentralblatt MATH, among others. According to the Journal Citation Reports, the journal has a 2019 impact factor of 1.650, ranking it 57th out of 93 journals in the category "Biology," 35th out of 59 journals in the category "Mathematical & Computational Biology" and 39th out of 124 journals in the category "Statistics & Probability".

== Editor-in-Chief ==
Murali Haran (USA) 2025 - 2027
Jorge Mateu (Spain) 2022 - 2024
Brian J. Reich (USA) 2019 --2021
Stephen Buckland (UK) 2016–2018
Montse Fuentes (USA) 2010 -- 2015
Carl Schwarz (Canada) 2007 -- 2009
Byron J.T. Morgan (UK) 2004 -- 2006
Linda Young (USA) 2002 -- 2004
Bryan Manly (New Zealand) 1999 -- 2001
Dallas E. Johnson (USA) 1996 --1998
