= Bad Nauheim =

- Town
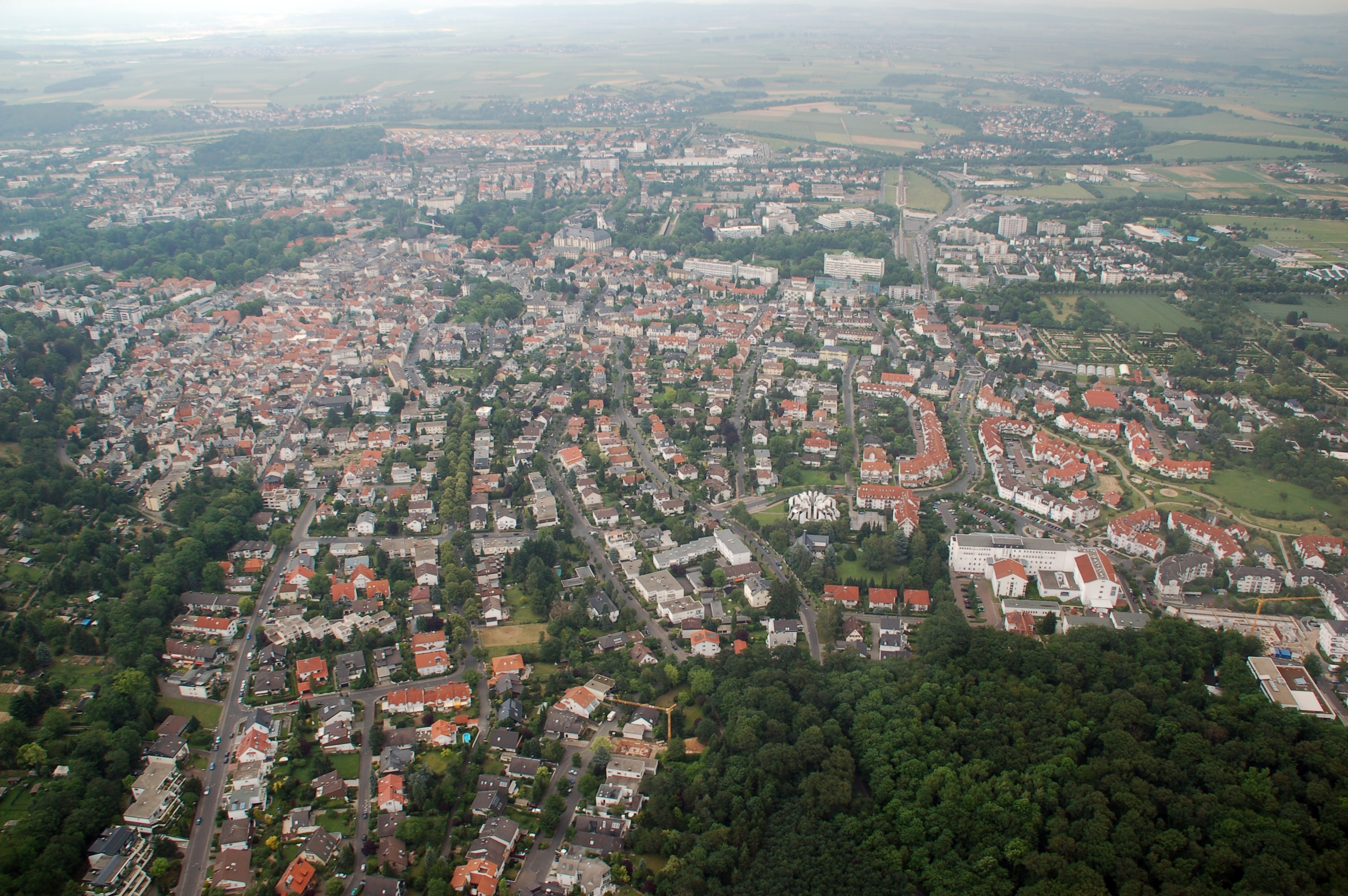
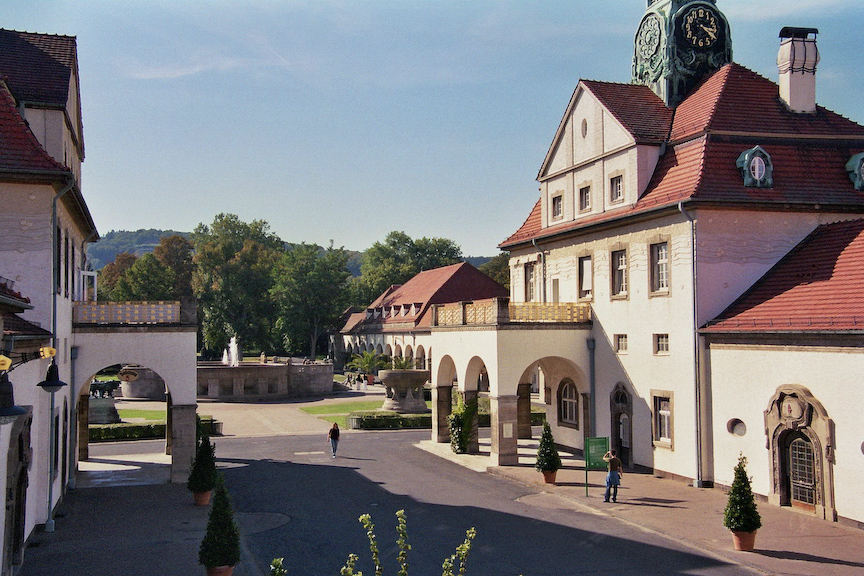
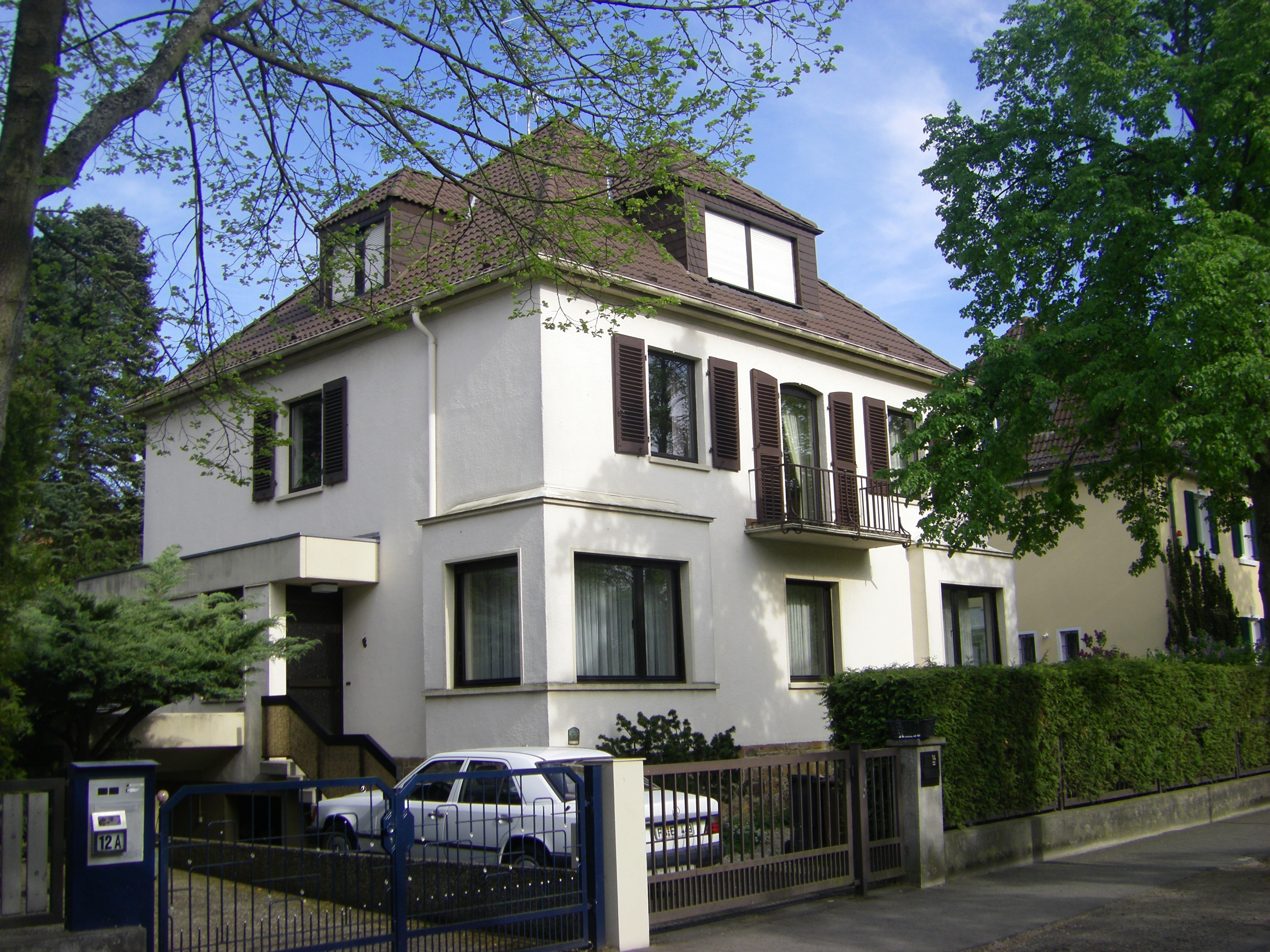
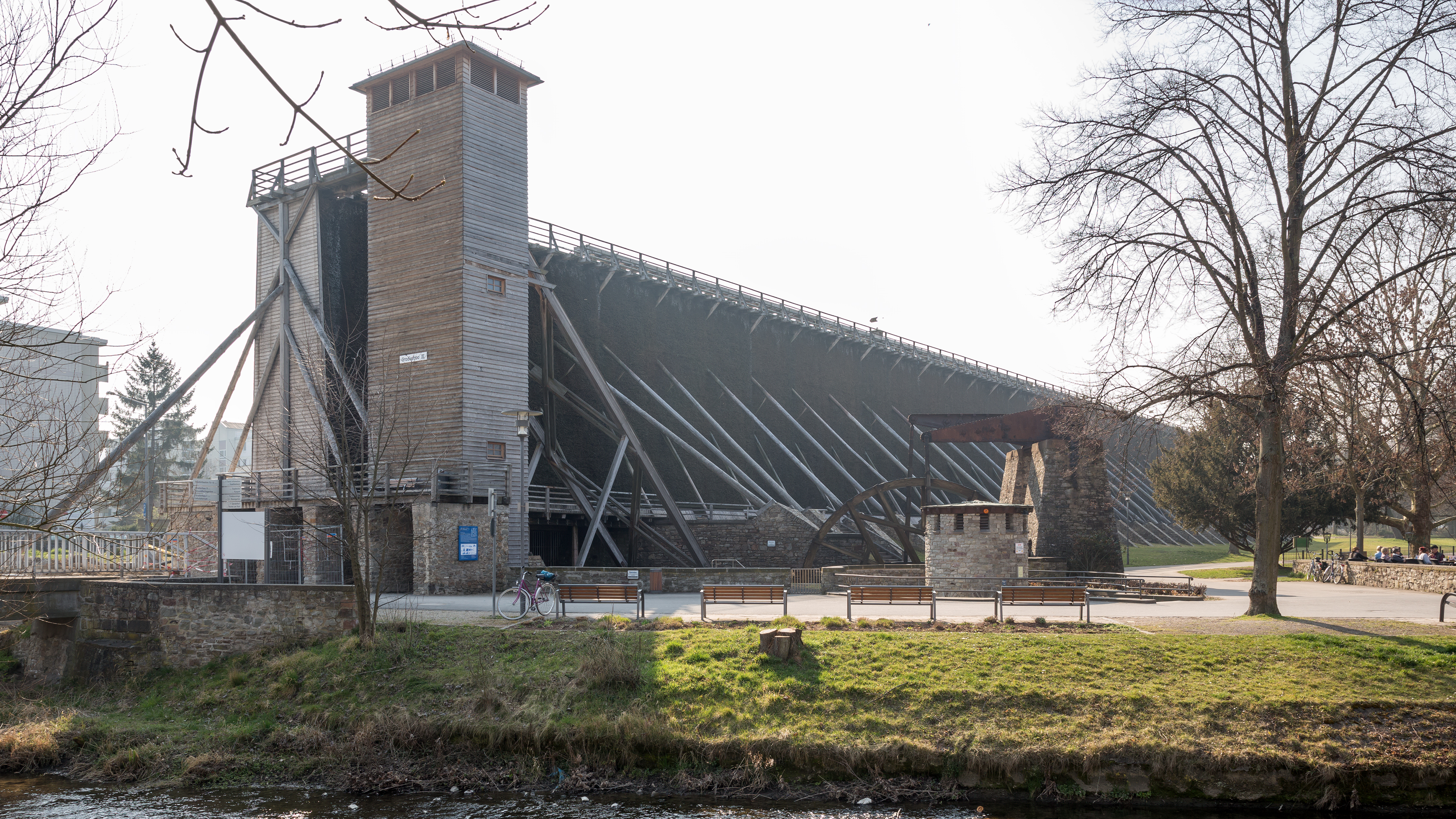
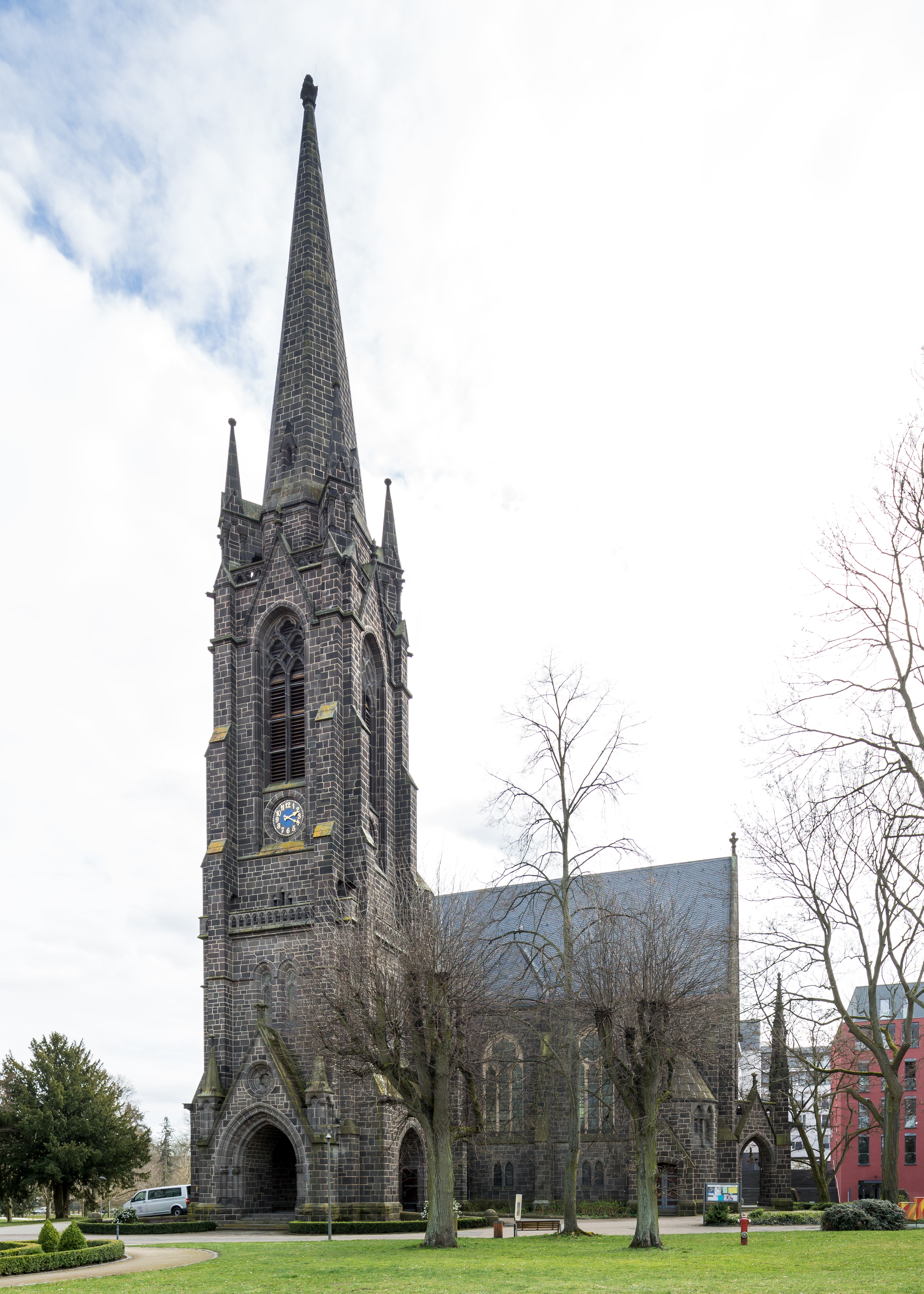
- Aerial view Sprudelhof Elvis Presley's House Graduation Tower III Dankeskirche

- Coat of arms

- Location of Bad Nauheim within Wetteraukreis district
- Interactive map of Bad Nauheim
- Location within Germany Location within Hesse
- Coordinates: 50°22′N 8°45′E
- Country: Germany
- State: Hesse
- Admin. region: Darmstadt
- District: Wetteraukreis
- Founded: 900
- Subdivisions: 6 districts

Government
  - Mayor (2023–29): Klaus Kreß (Ind.)

Area
  - Total: 32.54 km^{2} (12.56 sq mi)
- Elevation: 148 m (486 ft)

Population (2025-12-31)
  - Total: 32,700
  - Density: 1,000/km^{2} (2,600/sq mi)
- Time zone: UTC+01:00 (CET)
  - Summer (DST): UTC+02:00 (CEST)
- Postal codes: 61231
- Dialling codes: 06032
- Vehicle registration: FB
- Website: www.bad-nauheim.de

Bad Nauheim (German pronunciation: [baːt ˈnaʊhaɪm]) is a spa town in Wetteraukreis, Hesse, Germany.

As of 2020, Bad Nauheim has a population of 32,493. The town is approximately 35 kilometres (22 mi) north of Frankfurt am Main, on the east edge of the Taunus mountain range. It is a world-famous resort, noted for its salt springs, which are used to treat heart and nerve diseases. A Nauheim (or "effervescent") bath, named after Bad Nauheim, is a type of spa bath through which carbon dioxide is bubbled. This bath was one of several types of hydrotherapy used at the Battle Creek Sanitarium and it was also used at the Maurice Bathhouse in Bathhouse Row in the early 1900s during the heyday of hydrotherapy. The Konitzky Foundation, a charitable foundation and hospital for those without economic means, was founded in 1896 and its building occupies a central place next to the Kurpark.

== History ==
Before the Holocaust, there had been an on-and-off Jewish presence in Bad Nauheim since around 1303. At that time, nearly 400 Jews lived in the town, making up nearly 3% of the population. On Kristallnacht, the schoolhouse, Jewish stores, businesses and the synagogue were desecrated and ransacked. Many Jews were taken to concentration camps that night. Some were released. Of those set free, many were rearrested. By the end of the Holocaust, there were just three Jews remaining in Bad Nauheim. For the most part, those who were not murdered had left the country.

The Grand Hotel in Bad Nauheim was also the location of the Gestapo-led internment of around 115 Americans who were working in the U.S. Embassy as well as American journalists in Berlin in December 1941. During their five-month internment at the Grand Hotel, they published the Bad Nauheim Pudding, a locally created newspaper, until it was censored by the Germans. They also formed what they called Badheim University, which allowed the internees education in areas such as languages, phonetics, bible study, and travelogs. The group would leave Bad Nauheim on 12 May 1942 after their five-month internment in Jeschke's Grand Hotel.

During World War II, Adolf Hitler had a command complex in nearby Langenhain-Ziegenberg called Adlerhorst, "the Eagle's Nest" (not to be confused with Kehlsteinhaus of Obersalzberg, which was never referred to as "the Eagle's Nest" by the Nazis).

On 29 March 1945 Bad Nauheim was occupied by troops from the US Third Army. It was occupied by troops of the Fifteenth United States Army, which was a small group tasked with gathering historical information of Allied operations and documenting tactical methods of war from the Allied troops. It was used as a residential area for American occupation forces after World War II. Despite its proximity to Frankfurt am Main and Hitler's command complex, Bad Nauheim was totally spared from Allied bombing. American occupants from that time were told that President Roosevelt had loved the town so much from his days there that he ordered it spared.

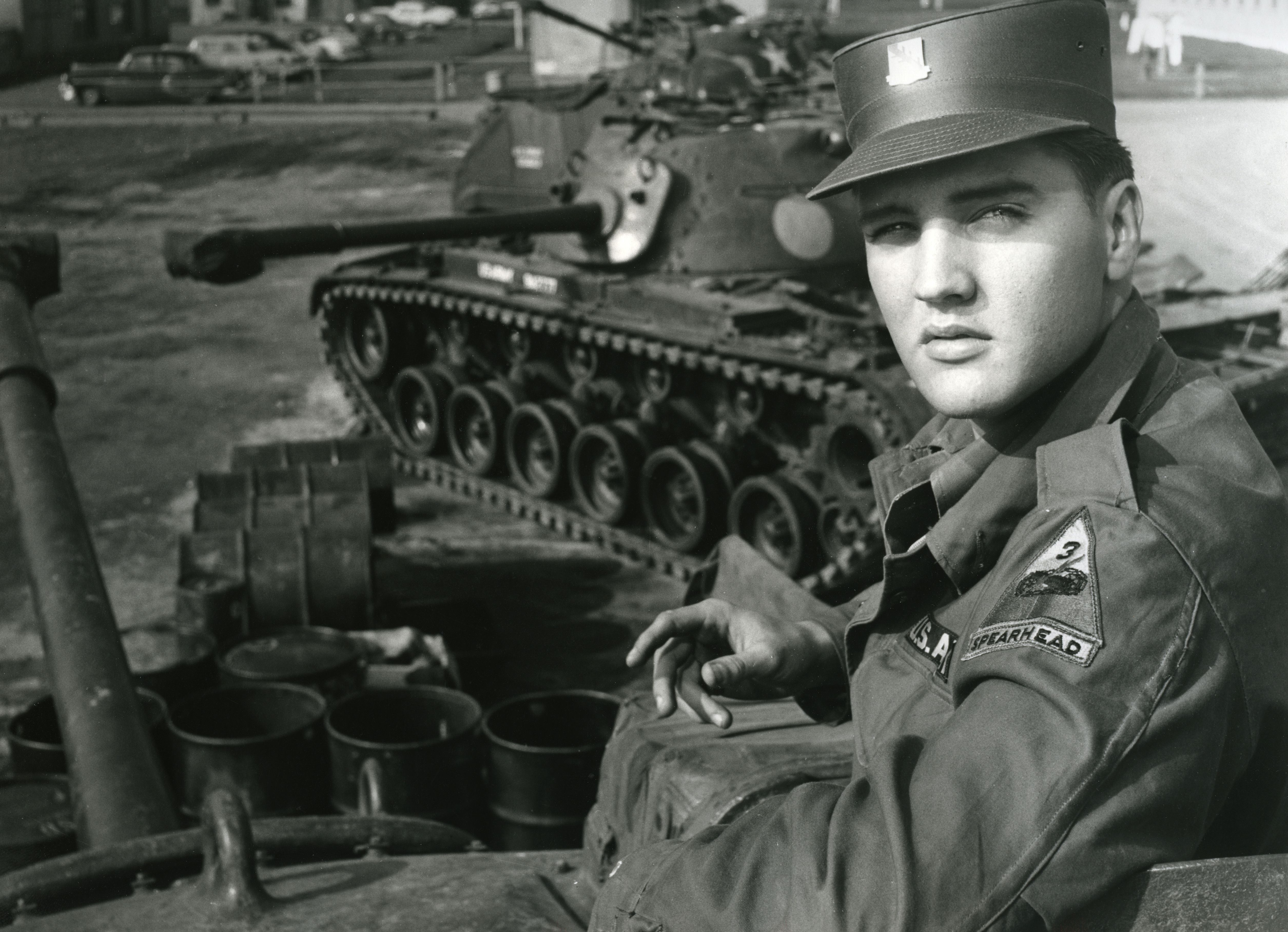
Elvis Presley at Ray Barracks, 1958

Elvis Presley lived in Bad Nauheim from 1958 to 1960 while serving in the U.S. Army. At the time, he was assigned to the 1st Medium Tank Battalion, 32d Armor, 3d Armored Division, at Ray Barracks near Friedberg. Since 2002, Bad Nauheim has hosted an annual Elvis festival.

Other famous people who have stayed in the town include Jamsetji Tata, founder of the Tata Group conglomerate company (he died in Bad Nauheim on 19 May 1904 at the age of 82), Irish novelist and Catholic priest Patrick Sheehan (who holidayed at the Hotel Augusta Victoria in Bad Nauheim from 6–23 September 1904), Franklin D. Roosevelt (as a boy, FDR had been taken for several extended visits to Bad Nauheim where his father underwent a water cure for his heart condition), the Saudi Arabian football team during the 2006 FIFA World Cup, George S. Patton (who celebrated his sixtieth birthday in the grand ballroom of the Grand Hotel), and Albert Kesselring, a Nazi general who died there in 1960.

== Churches ==
- Dankeskirche, Protestant church near the spa facilities, completed in 1906

== Education ==
- Freie Waldorfschule Wetterau
- Ernst-Ludwig-Schule (Gymnasium)
- St. Lioba Gymnasium (Gymnasium)
- Stadtschule an der Wilhelmskirche (Grund- und Hauptschule)
- Stadtschule Am Solgraben (Haupt- und Realschule)

== Mayors ==
- 1945–1948: Adolf Bräutigam (SPD)
- 1948–1954: Krafft-Helmut Voss (independent)
- 1954–1960: Fritz Geißler (FDP)
- 1960–1981: Herbert Schäfer (SPD)
- 1981–1993: Bernd Rohde (CDU)
- 1993–1999: Peter Keller (SPD)
- 2000–2005: Bernd Rohde (CDU)
- 2005–2011: Bernd Witzel (UWG)
- 2011–2017: Armin Häuser (CDU)
- since September 2017: Klaus Kreß (independent)

== Popular culture ==
The novel The Good Soldier by Ford Madox Ford (published 1915) is set in part at Bad Nauheim.

The internment of American journalists at the Grand Hotel in 1942 is depicted in a section of the novel The War Begins in Paris by Theodore Wheeler (published in 2023).

== Twin towns – sister cities ==
Bad Nauheim is twinned with:

- Bad Langensalza, Germany
- Buxton, England, United Kingdom
- Chaumont, France
- Oostkamp, Belgium

== The Sprudelhof ==
The Sprudelhof is recognized as the largest center of Jugendstil within Germany.

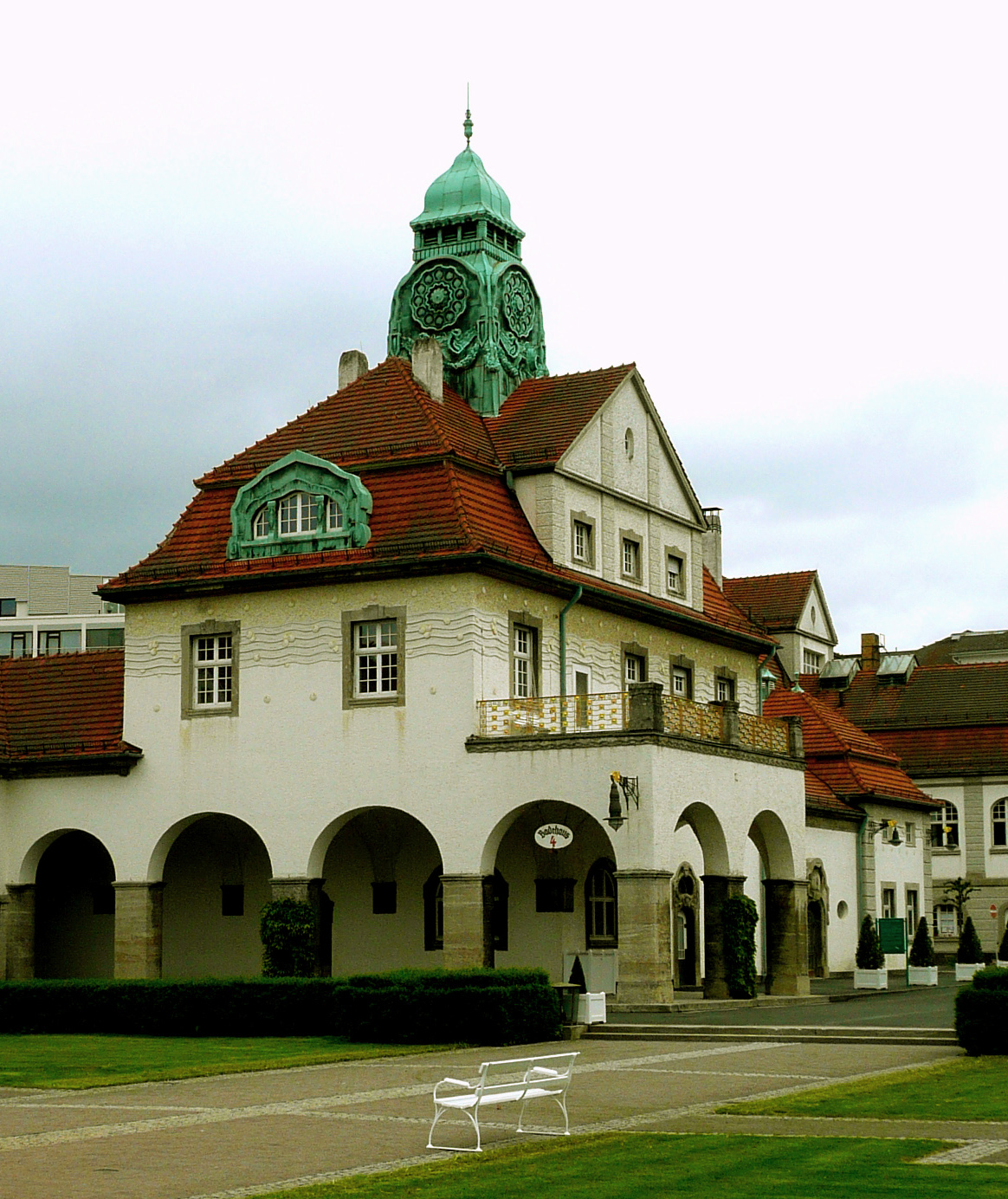
Bathhouse No. 4

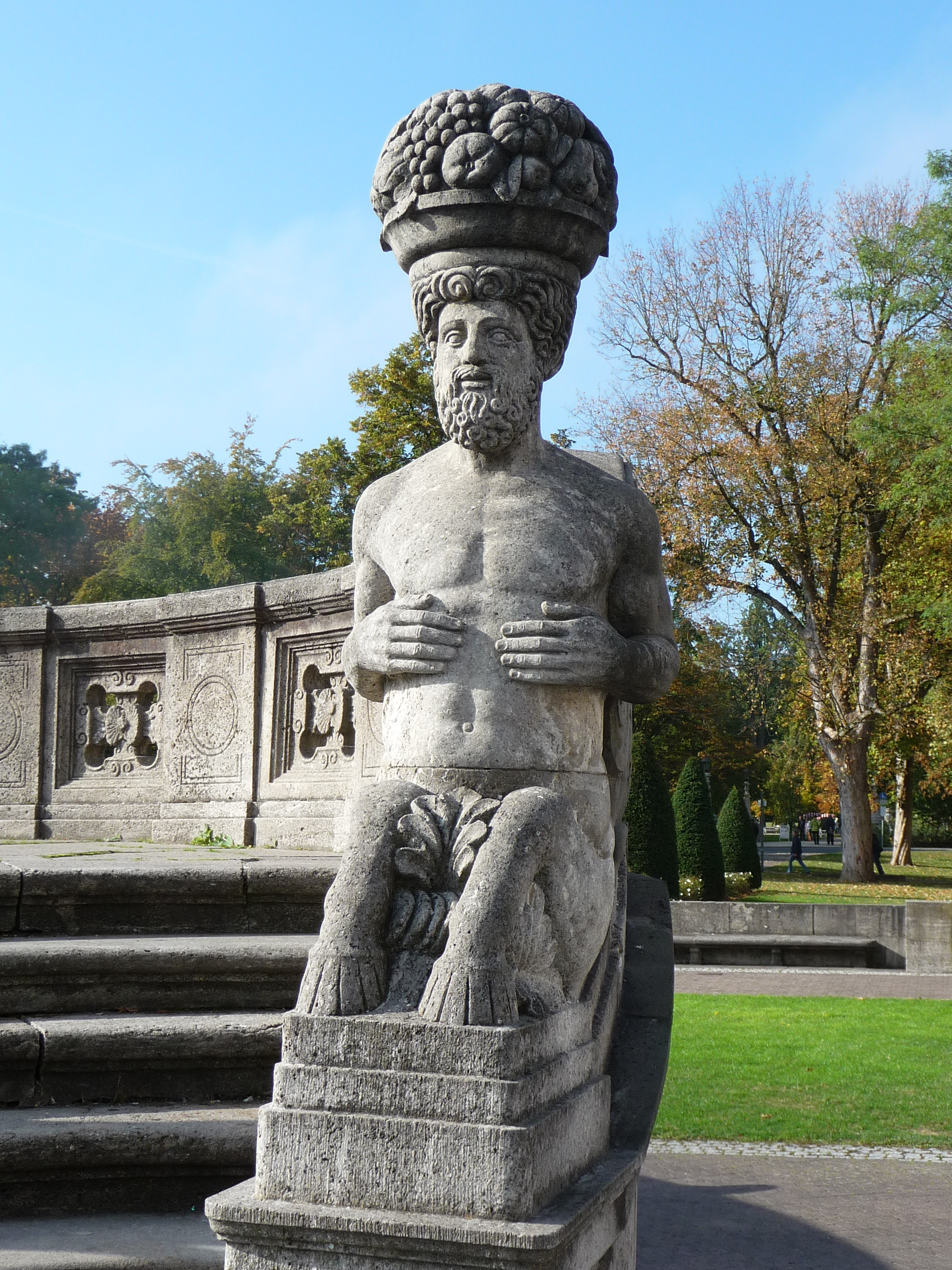
Centaur

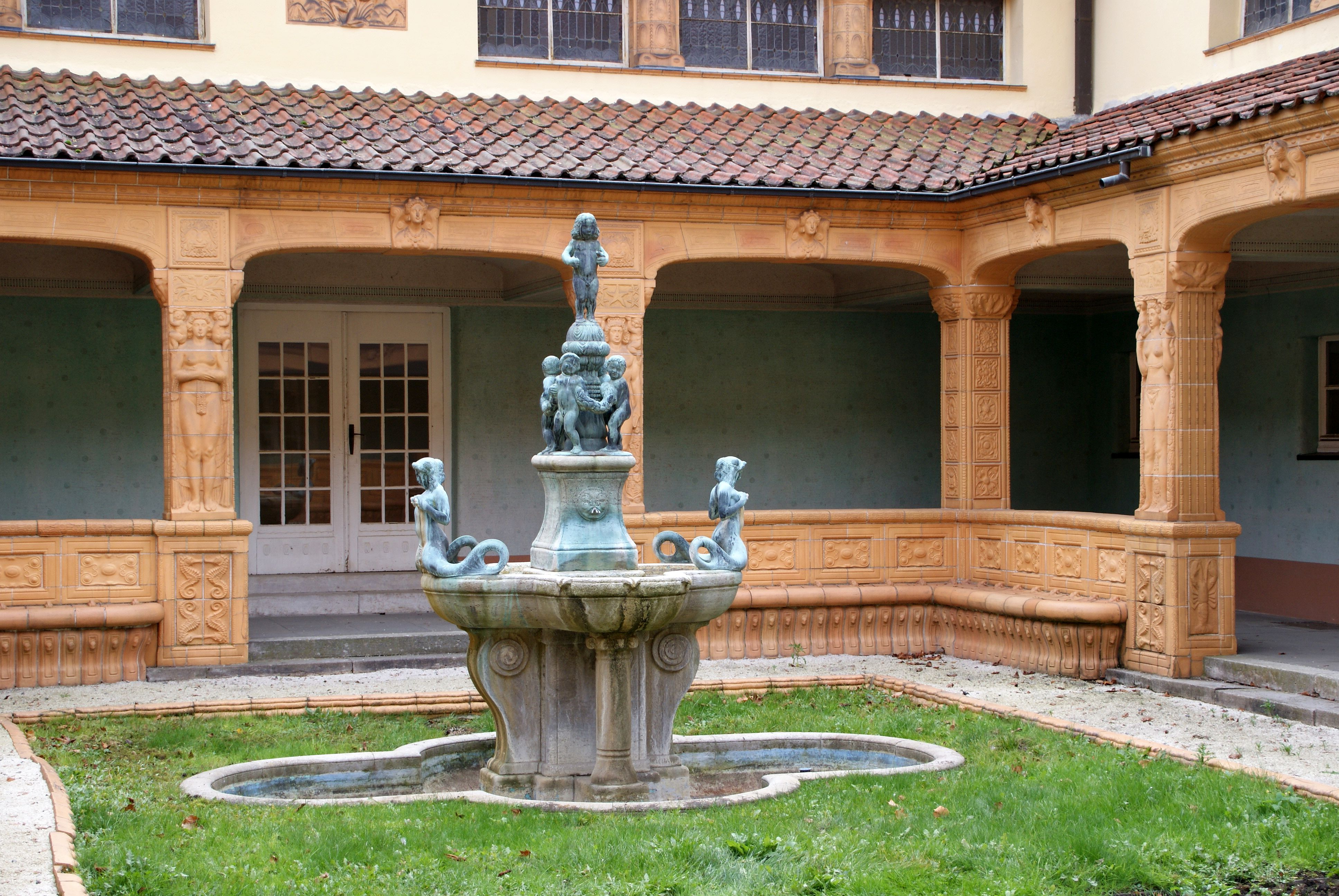
Courtyard

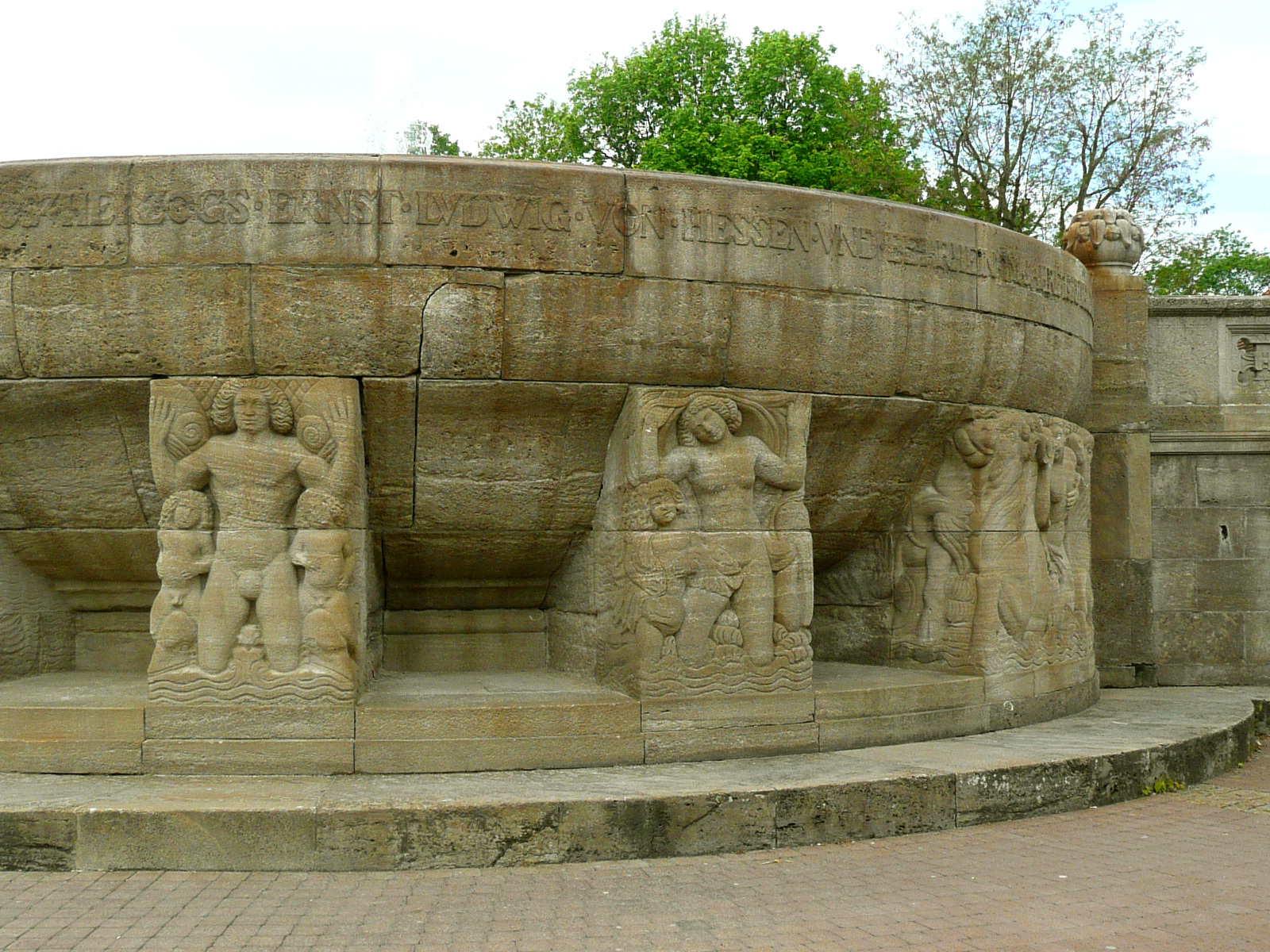
Fountain

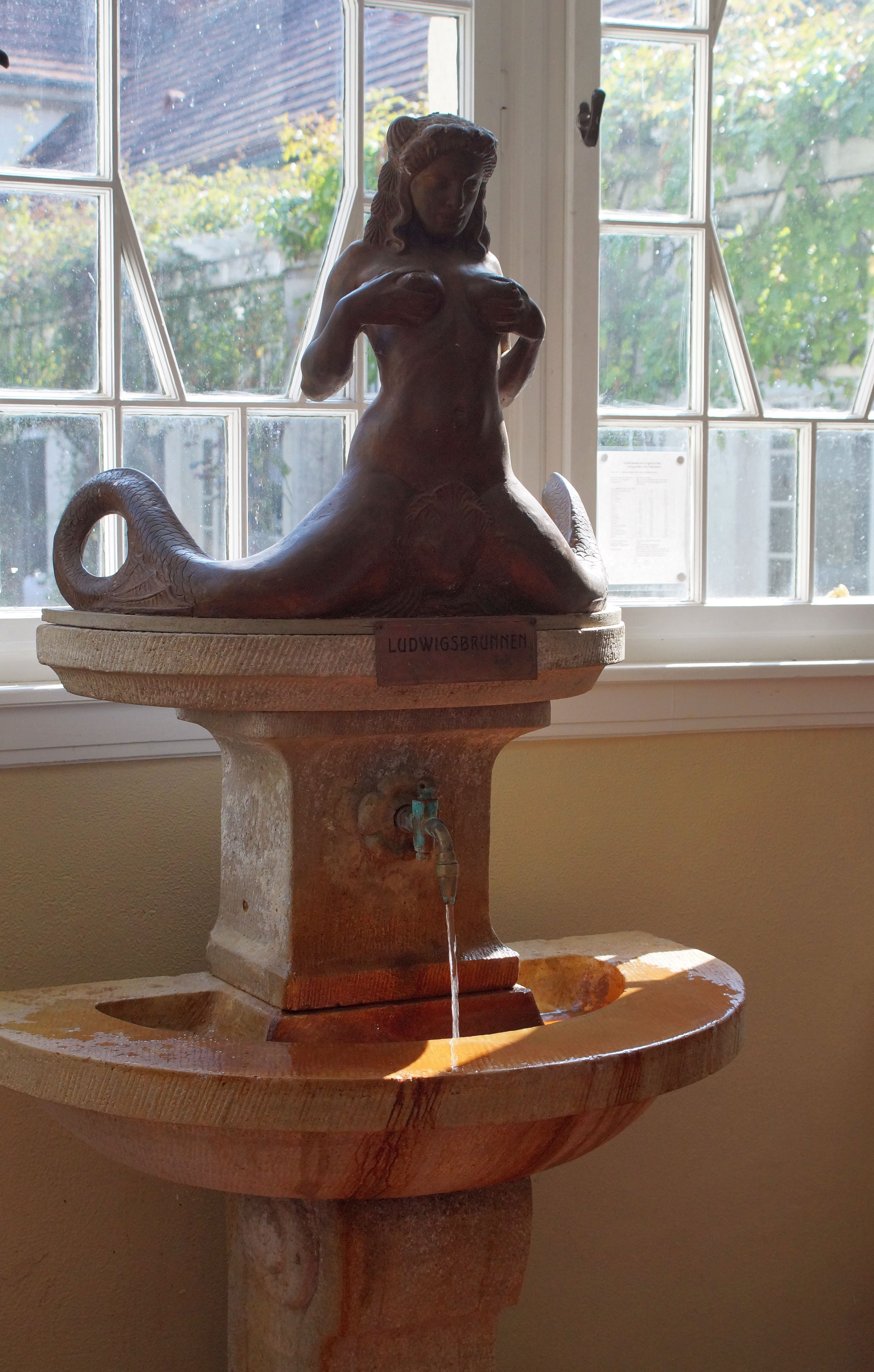
Mermaid

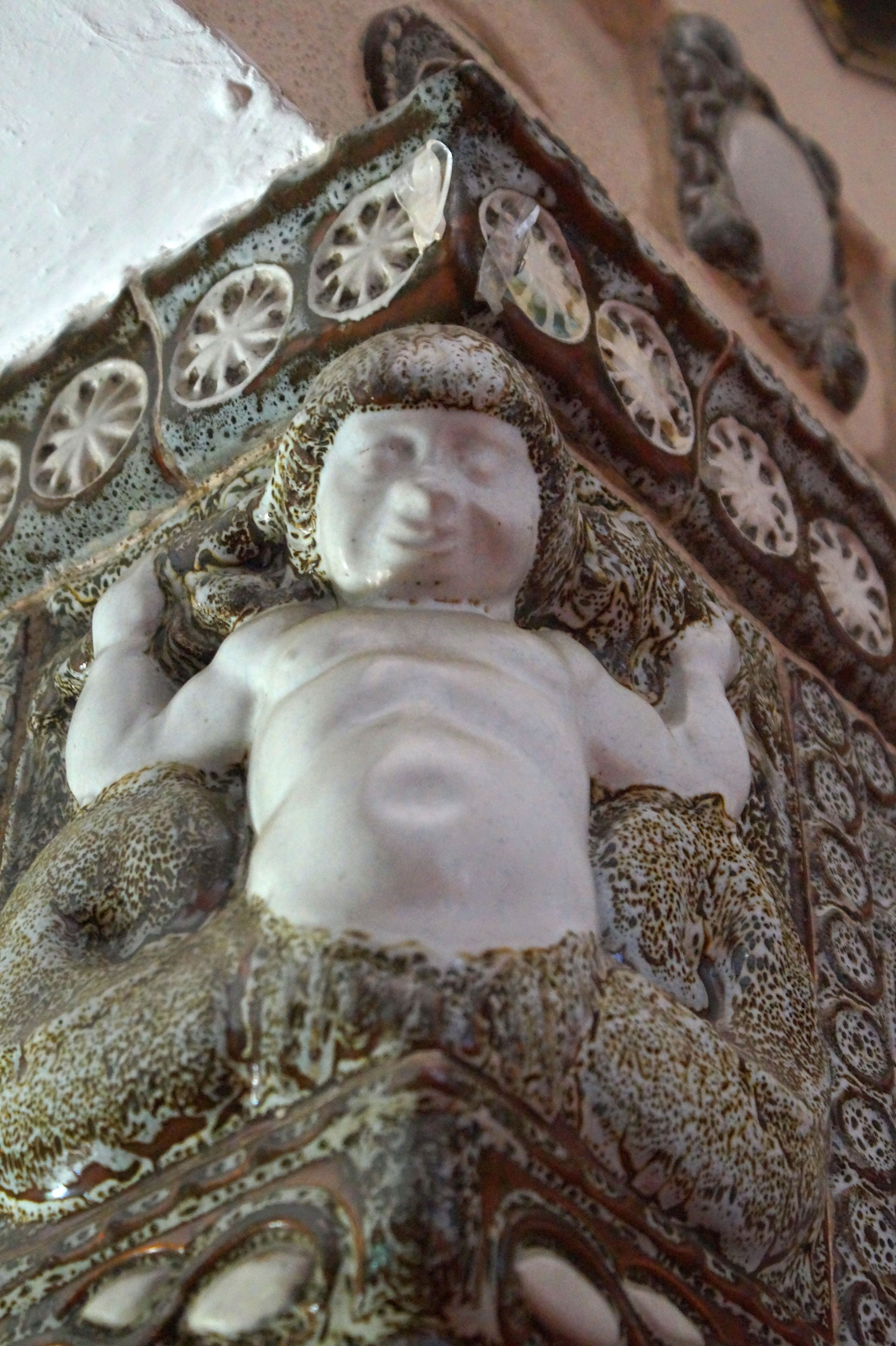
Triton

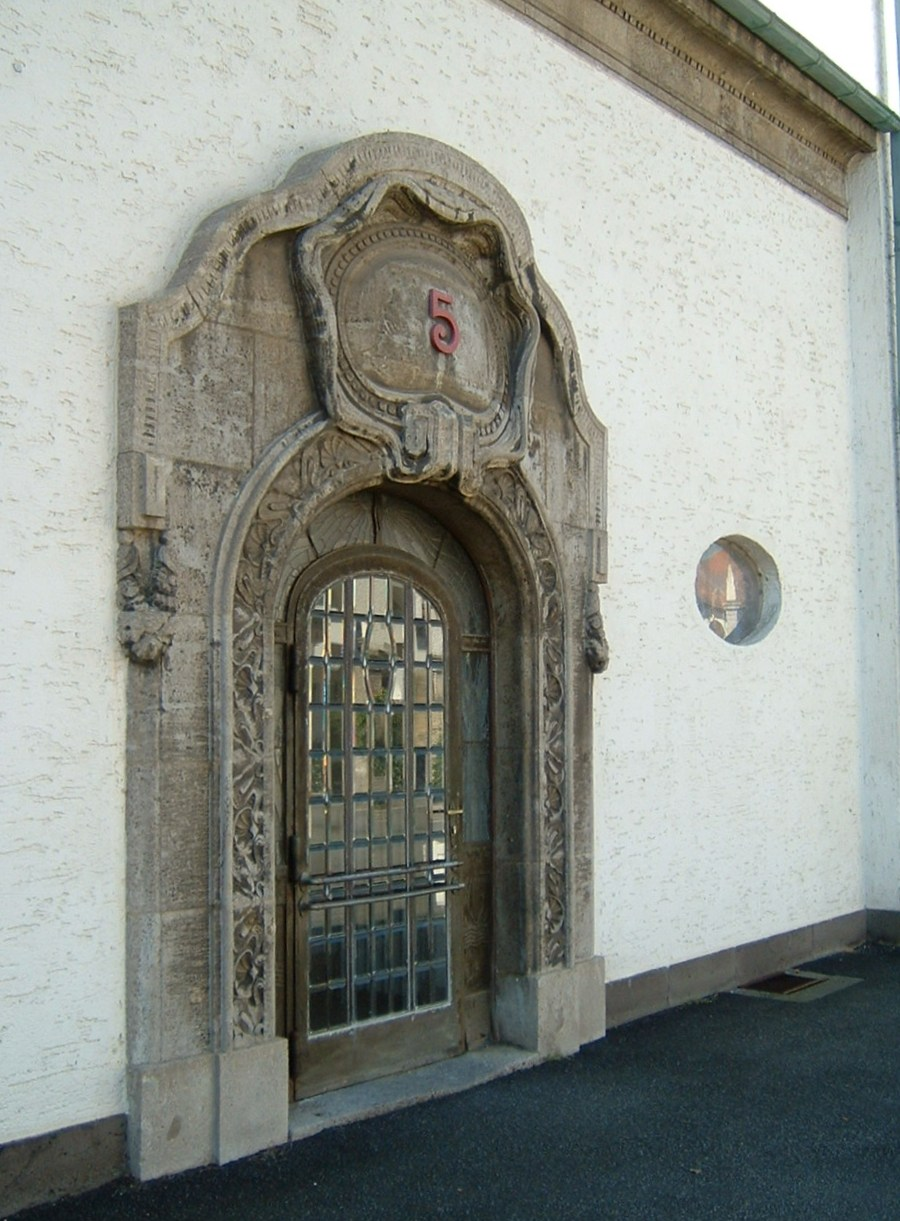
Bathhouse No. 5

== Notable residents ==
- Julian Dudda (born 1993), professional football player.
- Holger Geschwindner (born 1945), basketball player, long-time coach and mentor of Dirk Nowitzki
- Lisa Gnadl (born 1981), politician
- Klaus Hentschel (born 1961), physicist and historian of science
- Sina-Valeska Jung (born 1979), actress
- Caroline Link (born 1964), director, won the Academy Award for Best Foreign Language Film and Deutscher Filmpreis for Nowhere in Africa (2001)
- Jasmin Moghbeli (born 1983), American astronaut, born in Bad Nauheim
- Rainer Philipp (born 1950), ice hockey player
- Elvis Presley (1935–1977), American singer and actor, lived at Goethestrasse 14 from 1958 to 1960 while stationed at Ray Barracks near Friedberg.
- George S. Patton (1885–1945), U.S. Army general, commanded the Fifteenth Army at Bad Nauheim from October 1945 until his death in December
- Dirk Schlächter (1965), Bassist/Guitarist
- Jessica Wahls (born 1977), singer, former member of the girl group No Angels

== See also ==
- 811 Nauheima
