= Ray Barracks =

United States Army installation in Friedberg, Germany

- Friedberg, Hesse
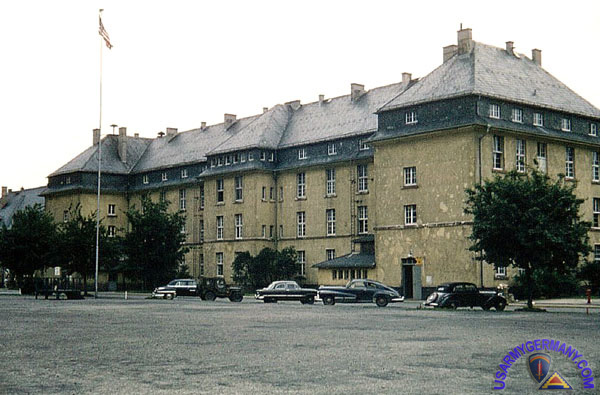
- Ray Barracks in 1956

Site information
- Owner: United States Department of Defense
- Controlled by: United States Army

Site history
- In use: 1945–2007

Garrison information
- Occupants: 3rd Brigade, 3rd Armored Division

Ray Barracks was a United States Army installation in Friedberg, Germany until it was closed by the U.S. government in 2007 and returned to the German government. Located in the southern part of the city near the industrial area, the barracks had numerous facilities. The barracks included a firing range for personal weapons qualification, an Urban warfare training site, vehicle maintenance facilities and various recreation facilities. After World War II the barracks were named after First Lieutenant Bernard J. Ray, who was awarded the Medal of Honor for his actions during the Battle of Hürtgen Forest. Ray sacrificed himself to destroy a wire obstacle that was blocking his unit's path. The base was closed in August 2007.

== History ==
=== Before 1945 ===
Friedberg's history as a garrison town dates back to 1645 when a company was formed there to guard the castle. The barracks were originally built in 1900, known as Wartturm Kaserne, and used during World War I and World War II. Early in 1913 the construction of the present kaserne started and by October of the same year the 2nd Battalion of the Hessian 168th Infantry Regiment were stationed there. In the fall of 1914 the entire kaserne was completed. During World War I the kaserne was used to confine Russian, French and British officers. After the war the police took possession of the kaserne until 1933 when Austrian sympathizers of the Nazi regime lived there. At the request of city officials, soldiers were stationed at the kaserne in 1938; specifically, the Wehrmacht's 3rd Battalion of the 36th Infantry Regiment. Additional buildings were constructed on the kaserne to make room for more soldiers. Most of these soldiers were eventually deployed to Eastern Front.

=== After World War II ===
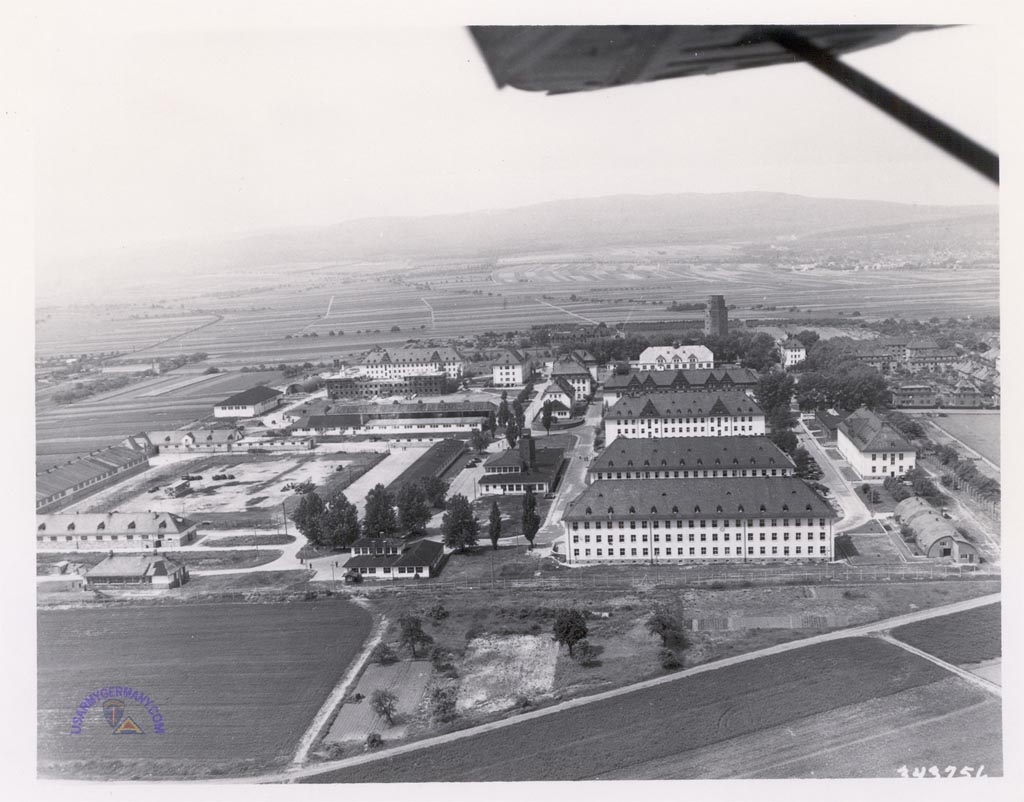
An aerial view of the barracks in 1950

After 1945 various American units were stationed at Ray Barracks, most recently 3rd Armored Division and 1st Armored Division components.

The first American units occupied the kaserne in 1945. There were both infantry and armored units housed at the kaserne. In 1948 the kaserne was occupied by units later to be designated the 16th Infantry Regiment of the 1st Infantry Division. One of the infantry units was the Headquarters Battalion of the 8th Infantry Regiment, 4th Infantry Division. The 4th Division Headquarters were in Frankfurt. Various other commands also used the barracks until Combat Command C of the 3rd Armored Division moved in about 15 April 1956. The barracks were named in honor of First Lieutenant Bernard J. Ray, Company F, 8th Infantry Regiment, who was awarded the Medal of Honor after his death.

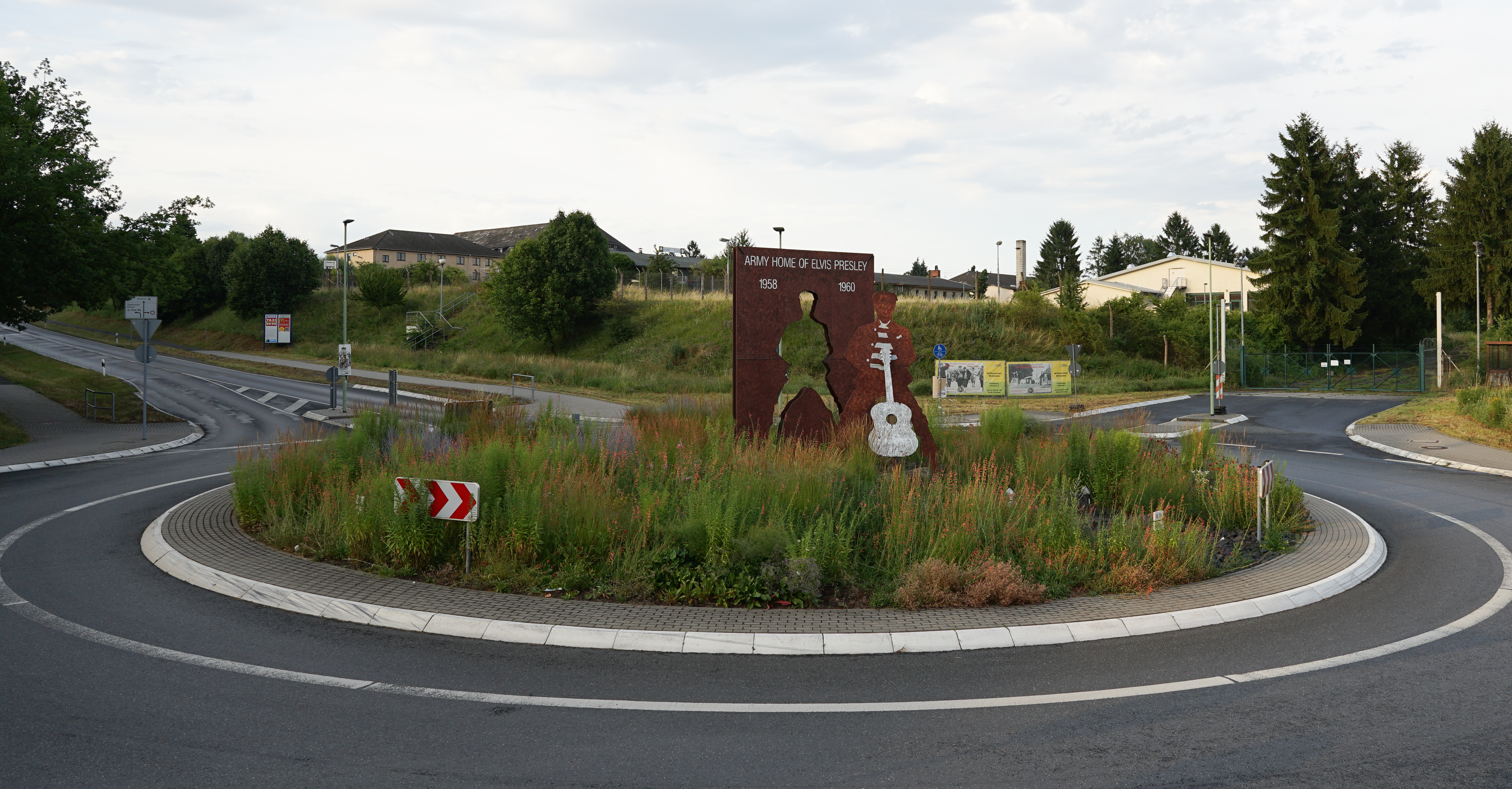
Elvis Presley-Monument at former Ray Barracks, 2017

After being drafted in 1958 Elvis Presley joined the Scout Platoon of the 3rd Armored Division's 1st Medium Tank Battalion, 32nd Armor who were stationed at Ray Barracks. He choose to not receive any special treatment and was respected for not joining Special Services, which would have allowed him to avoid certain duties and maintain his public profile. He did not live on base at Ray Barracks, but was able to live in the nearby resort city of Bad Nauheim. Presley's battalion, redesignated the 4th Battalion, 67th Armor, nicknamed the "Bandits," would be later commanded back-to-back by West Point classmates and future Army Generals Albert Bryant, Jr. and Martin Dempsey (later Chairman of the Joint Chiefs of Staff), who maintained their office above the "Elvis Aaron Presley Mess Hall," partially funded by Presley. Notably, former U.S. Secretary of State and retired General Colin Powell began his Army career as a Second Lieutenant in 1958 in the 3rd Armored Division, but in Gelnhausen, not Friedberg.

The 3rd Armored Division used Ray Barracks until its retirement of colors in 1996 at which time the 1st Armored Division (Forward) occupied the installation until 2007 when the forces stationed there were returned to the United States.

At the time of the installation closing in 2007 (along with nearby Giessen Depot) both bases were the home of the 1st Brigade Combat Team "Ready First", 1st Armored Division which had participated in 2 deployments to Iraq (2003-04, 2006–07) in support of Operation Iraqi Freedom. The closing ceremony for United States Army Garrison Giessen was held on 28 September 2007, and on 10 January 2008 Ray Barracks was officially closed. It was last occupied by a 102nd Signal Battalion telephone switch for the Friedberg and Giessen United States Army garrisons, originally installed in 1986. The installation was then returned to the German government.

In February 2023, the city of Friedberg announced its intention to convert the site into an urban district with apartments and commerce. To this end, a private investor is to be sought together with the responsible federal authorities by 2025.
