= Martin Schumacher =

German statistician

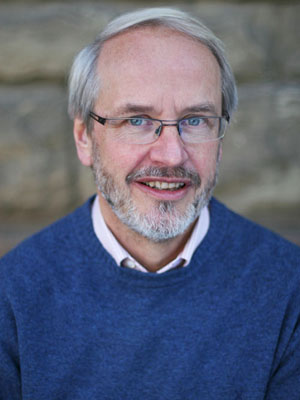
- Occupation: Statistician

Martin Schumacher (born June 28, 1950) is a German statistician. He was the head of the Institute for Medical Biometry and Statistics of the Medical Center of the University of Freiburg from 1986 until 2017.

== Life and work ==
Martin Schumacher graduated from the University of Dortmund with a diploma in mathematics and statistics in 1974. He stayed in Dortmund and earned his PhD in 1977. Between 1975 and 1979 and 1983 and 1986 he first worked as research assistant for Prof. Siegfried Schach and then as Professor for Statistics in Science. In between those periods of time in Dortmund, he spent the years 1979-1983 in Heidelberg at the Institute for Medicinal Statistics at the University of Heidelberg, headed by Herbert Immich. There he qualified as a professor in 1982 with a thesis focusing on the analysis of survival time. In 1984 he worked as a guest professor at the Department of Biostatistics of the University of Washington in Seattle, WA (USA). Shortly after returning to the statistics department of the University of Dortmund he was offered a professorship at the Institute for Medical Biometry and Statistics of University Medical Center Freiburg. He became the head of the institute from April 1986 until his retirement in May 2017.

Immediately after starting his job in Freiburg he founded a center for methodological support of therapy studies, one of the first of its kind at a German university medical center. In 1999 one of the first coordination centers for clinical studies (short KKS = Koordinierungszentrum für Klinische Studien) in Germany was founded at the Medical Center - University of Freiburg on the initiative of Martin Schumacher.

In addition to doing research another focus of Martin Schumacher was the training and mentorship of young research, so teaching was a priority. The book "Methodik Klinischer Studien" (Methodology of Clinical Trials) by Schumacher and Schulgen is not only the first book on this topic in German, but also the standard textbook in Germany.

Martin Schumacher was the dean of the Medical Faculty of the University of Freiburg between 2001 and 2003. He was a member of the Faculty of Mathematics and Physics and there has been a cooperation with researchers and scientists in the fields of mathematics, physics, biology and computer science within the framework of the interdisciplinary Freiburg Center for Data Analysis and Modeling (FDM). Due to several research projects initiated and led by Martin Schumacher the institute has become an internationally renowned research hub for biostatistics in Germany.

There were several international symposia focused on methodology, Martin Schumacher also recurrently hosted conferences on medical statistics in Oberwolfach and the International Biometrical Conference (IBC) in 2002, as well as the third meeting of the German Consortium in Statistics (DAGStat 2013). His international reputation can also be gleaned by the fact that he was invited to give the 21st Bradford Hill Memorial Lecture in 2012. Under the clinical aspect the Cochrane Collaboration/German Cochrane Center as well as the German Clinical Trials Register (DRKS) need to be mentioned.

Martin Schumacher is the (co-)author of over 250 scientific publications and oversaw more than thirty dissertations. He published many papers about various methodological and statistical aspects of the planning and analysis of studies in the field of clinical epidemiology. Here, the implementation of the newly developed statistical methods in clinical practice and therefore a close cooperation with various clinical partners was the focus of the research.

== Publications ==
- Methodik klinischer Studien: Methodische Grundlagen der Planung, Durchführung und Auswertung. Martin Schumacher, Gabi Schulgen, Springer 2008.
- Competing Risks and Multistate Models with R. Jan Beyersmann, Arthur Allignol, Martin Schumacher, Springer 2012.

== Honors ==
- Bradford Hill Memorial Lecture (2012)
- Honorary member of the German Chapter of the International Biometrical Society (2014)
- Honorary member of the International Society for Clinical Biostatistics (2015)
- Honorary Life Member of the International Biometric Society (2018)
