= Biometrics (journal) =

- Discipline: Statistics
- Language: English
- Edited by: Alan Welsh, Debashish Ghosh, Mark Brewer, Geert Molenberghs

Publication details
- History: 1945–present
- Publisher: International Biometric Society; Oxford University Press; (United Kingdom)
- Frequency: Quarterly
- Impact factor: 1.701 (2021)

Standard abbreviations
- ISO 4: Biometrics

Indexing
- CODEN: BIOMB6
- ISSN: 0006-341X (print); 1541-0420 (web)
- LCCN: 49001784
- JSTOR: 0006341X
- OCLC no.: 5898885

Links
- Journal homepage; Journal page at publisher's website; Online archive (1990-2023)

Biometrics is a journal that publishes articles on the application of statistics and mathematics to the biological sciences. It is published by the International Biometric Society (IBS).

== History ==
Originally published in 1945 under the title Biometrics Bulletin, the journal adopted the shorter title in 1947. A notable contributor to the journal was R.A. Fisher, for whom a memorial edition was published in 1964. In a survey of statistics researchers' opinions, it was ranked fifth overall among 40 statistics journals, and it was second only to the Journal of the American Statistical Association in the ranking provided by biometrics specialists.
