= International Biometric Society =

Academic and professional society

International Biometric Society (IBS)
- Formation: 1947; 79 years ago
- Type: Learned society
- Purpose: "Devoted to the development and application of statistical and mathematical theory and methods in the biosciences"
- Headquarters: Washington, DC
- Members: 6000
- President: José C. Pinheiro
- Publication: Biometrics, Biometrical Journal, JABES
- Website: biometricsociety.org

The International Biometric Society (IBS) is an international professional and academic society promoting the development and application of statistical and mathematical theory and methods in the biosciences, including biostatistics. It sponsors the International Biometric Conference (IBC), held every two years.

== History ==
The society was founded on September 6, 1947, at the First International Biometric Conference at Woods Hole, Massachusetts, US. Its first president was Ronald Fisher, its first secretary was Chester Ittner Bliss, and its first treasurer was J. W. Hopkins.

== Regions and networks ==
The society is organized into (mostly national) regions and (international) networks, many of which also hold their own conferences.

== Publications ==
It publishes the journal Biometrics, the Journal of Agricultural, Biological, and Environmental Statistics (JABES) jointly with the American Statistical Association, the quarterly newsletter Biometric Bulletin, and the regional journal Biometrical Journal (formerly Biometrische Zeitschrift).

== Past presidents ==
1. Ronald A. Fisher (1947–49)
2. A. Linder (1950–51)
3. Georges Darmois (1952–53)
4. William G. Cochran (1954–55)
5. E. A. Cornish (1956–57)
6. Cyril H. Goulden (1958–59)
7. L. Martin (1960–61)
8. Chester I. Bliss (1962–63)
9. David John Finney (1964–65)
10. Luigi Luca Cavalli-Sforza (1966–67)
11. Gertrude M. Cox (1968–69)
12. Berthold Schneider (1970–71)
13. Peter Armitage (1972–73)
14. C. R. Rao (1974–75)
15. Henry L. Le Roy (1976–77)
16. John A. Nelder (1978–79)
17. Richard M. Cormack (1980–81)
18. Herbert A. David (1982–83)
19. Pierre A. Dagnelie (1984–85)
20. Geoffrey H. Freeman (1986–87)
21. Jonas H. Ellenberg (1988–89)
22. Richard Tomassone (1990–91)
23. Niels Keiding (1992–93)
24. Lynne Billard (1994–95)
25. Byron J. T. Morgan (1996–97)
26. Susan R. Wilson (1998–99)
27. Nanny Wermuth (2000–01)
28. Norman E. Breslow (2002–03)
29. Geert Molenberghs (2004–05)
30. Thomas A. Louis (2006–07)
31. Andrew Mead (2008–09)
32. Kaye Basford (2010–11)
33. Clarice G. B. Demetrio (2012–13)
34. John Hinde (2014–15)
35. Elizabeth Thompson (2016–17)
36. Louise M. Ryan (2018–19)
37. Geert Verbeke (2020–21)
