= List of statistics journals =

This is a list of scientific journals published in the field of statistics.

== Introductory and outreach ==
- The American Statistician
- Significance

== General theory and methodology ==
- Annals of the Institute of Statistical Mathematics
- Annals of Statistics
- AStA Wirtschafts- und Sozialstatistisches Archiv
- Biometrika
- The Canadian Journal of Statistics
- Communications in Statistics
- International Statistical Review
- Journal of the American Statistical Association
- Journal of Multivariate Analysis
- Journal of the Royal Statistical Society
- Probability and Mathematical Statistics
- Sankhyā: The Indian Journal of Statistics
- Scandinavian Journal of Statistics
- Statistica Neerlandica
- Statistica Sinica
- Statistical Science
- Stochastic Processes and their Applications

== Applications ==
- The Annals of Applied Statistics
- Journal of Applied Statistics
- The Journal of Risk Model Validation
- Journal of Statistical Software
- Journal of the Royal Statistical Society, Series C: Applied Statistics
- Statistical Modelling
- Statistics and its Interface
- The R Journal
- Stata Journal

== Statistics education ==
- Journal of Statistics and Data Science Education

== Specialized journals in various areas of statistics ==
=== Biostatistics ===
- Biometrical Journal
- Biometrics
- Biometrika
- Biostatistics
- The International Journal of Biostatistics
- Pharmaceutical Statistics
- Statistical Applications in Genetics and Molecular Biology
- Statistical Methods in Medical Research
- Statistics in Medicine (journal)

=== Computational statistics ===
- Communications in Statistics - Simulation and Computation
- Computational Statistics
- Computational Statistics & Data Analysis
- Journal of Computational and Graphical Statistics
- Journal of Statistical Computation and Simulation
- Statistics and Computing

=== Econometrics ===
- Applied Econometrics and International Development
- Econometric Reviews
- Econometric Theory
- Econometrica
- Journal of Applied Econometrics
- Journal of Business & Economic Statistics
- Journal of Econometrics
- The Review of Economics and Statistics

=== Environmental and ecological sciences ===
- Atmospheric Environment
- Journal of Agricultural, Biological, and Environmental Statistics

=== Physical sciences, technology, and quality ===
- Chemometrics and Intelligent Laboratory Systems
- Journal of Chemometrics
- Journal of Statistical Mechanics: Theory and Experiment
- Journal of Statistical Physics
- Physica A: Statistical mechanics and its applications
- Technometrics

=== Social sciences ===
- British Journal of Mathematical and Statistical Psychology
- Journal of Educational and Behavioral Statistics
- Journal of the Royal Statistical Society, Series A: Statistics in Society
- Multivariate Behavioral Research
- Psychological Methods
- Psychometrika
- Structural Equation Modeling

=== Time-series analysis ===
- International Journal of Forecasting
- Journal of Time Series Analysis

== Open access statistics journals ==
The following journals are considered open access:

- Bayesian Analysis
- Brazilian Journal of Probability and Statistics
- Chilean Journal of Statistics
- Electronic Journal of Statistics
- Journal of Official Statistics
- Journal of Modern Applied Statistical Methods
- Journal of Statistical Software
- Journal of Statistics Education
- Revista Colombiana de Estadistica (Colombian Journal of Statistics)
- REVSTAT
- SORT
- Statistics Surveys
- Survey Methodology/Techniques d'enquête
- The R Journal

== See also ==
- List of scientific journals
- List of probability journals
- List of mathematics journals
