= Geoffrey McLachlan =

Geoffrey John McLachlan
- Born: 3 October 1946 (age 78); Rockhampton, Queensland, Australia
- Education: University of Queensland
- Scientific career
- Institutions: University of Queensland
- Doctoral advisor: Stephen Lipton
- Doctoral students: Kaye Basford
- Other notable students: Peter Donnelly

Geoffrey John McLachlan FAA (born 3 October 1946) is an Australian researcher in computational statistics, machine learning and pattern recognition. McLachlan is best known for his work in classification and finite mixture models. He is the joint author of five influential books on the topics of mixtures and classification, as well as their applications. Currently, McLachlan is a Professor of statistics within the School of Mathematics and Physics at the University of Queensland.

== Education and career ==
McLachlan was born in Rockhampton and obtained his BSc in mathematics at the University of Queensland in 1969. He went to pursue a PhD at the same university in 1973 under the supervision of Stephen Lipton, a former staff member at the famous Rothamsted experimental station in the UK. McLachlan obtained a Doctor of Science at the University of Queensland in 1994. He has served in many positions of academic service over his career, most notably including as an Australian Research Council College of Experts member (2008–2010). McLachlan is currently serving on the editorial boards of the journals: Advances in Data Analysis and Classification, BMC Bioinformatics, Cancer Informatics, Journal of Classification, Statistics and Computing, Statistical Modelling, Statistics Surveys, and WIREs Data Mining and Knowledge Discovery. McLachlan has also supervised numerous PhD students over his career, most notably including Professor Kaye Basford at the University of Queensland and Professor Angus Ng at Griffith University.

McLachlan is a prolific author in the fields of computational statistics, pattern recognition, machine learning, and neural networks. He has written over 300 research articles. Further, Google Scholar lists him with an h-index of 63 and attributes over 60000 citations to his publications.

The themes in McLachlan's work include the use of finite mixtures of atypical distributions for clustering of complex data. This includes the use of multivariate t-distributions, and skew variants of multivariate t- and normal distributions. His works have found applications in numerous areas of practical research including biology, bioinformatics, cardiology, engineering, psychology, neuroimaging, among numerous other fields. McLachlan's research has been published in various well-regarded journals such as Biometrics; Biometrika; Journal of the Royal Statistical Society; Journal of the American Statistical Association; Proceedings of the National Academy of Sciences of the USA; Nature Methods; the Computer Journal; and the IEEE Transactions on Pattern Analysis and Machine Intelligence, Medical Imaging, and Neural Networks. He is a featured researcher in Journeys to Data Mining: Experiences from 15 Renowned Researchers, edited by Mohamed Medhat Gaber.

== Honours and awards ==
- Australian Research Council Professorial Fellow (2007-2011)
- Pitman Medal of the Statistical Society of Australia (2010)
- ISI Highly Cited Author (2010)
- President of the International Federation of Classification Societies (2010-2011)
- IEEE ICDM Research Contributions Award (2011)
- UQ Vice-Chancellor's Senior Research Fellow (2012-2015)
- Shayle Searle Visiting Fellow at Victoria University of Wellington, New Zealand (2014)
- Fellow of the Australian Academy of Science (2015)
- Research Medal of the International Federation of Classification Societies (2017)

== Published books ==
- The EM Algorithm and Extensions Second Edition, G.J. McLachlan and T. Krishnan (2008). Hoboken, New Jersey: Wiley. International Standard Book Number ISBN 978-0-471-20170-0
- Analyzing Microarray Gene Expression Data, G.J. McLachlan, K.-A. Do, and C. Ambroise (2004). Hoboken, New Jersey: Wiley. International Standard Book Number ISBN 978-0-471-72612-8
- Finite Mixture Models, G.J. McLachlan and D. Peel. (2000). New York: Wiley. International Standard Book Number ISBN 978-0-471-00626-8
- Discriminant Analysis and Statistical Pattern Recognition, G.J. McLachlan (1992). New York: Wiley. International Standard Book Number ISBN 978-0-471-69115-0
- Mixture Models: Inference and Applications to Clustering, G.J. McLachlan and K.E. Basford (1988). New York: Marcel Dekker.

== Personal life ==
McLachlan is married to Beryl Seymour in 1973, and has two sons, Jonathan and Robbie, and four granddaughters.
