= Random number table =

Printed lists of randomly created digits

Random number tables have been used in statistics for tasks such as selected random samples. This was much more effective than manually selecting the random samples (with dice, cards, etc.). Currently, tables of random numbers have been replaced by computational random number generators.

If carefully prepared, the filtering and testing processes remove any noticeable bias or asymmetry from the hardware-generated original numbers so that such tables provide the most "reliable" random numbers available to the casual user.

Any published (or otherwise accessible) random data table is unsuitable for cryptographic purposes since the accessibility of the numbers makes them effectively predictable, and hence their effect on a cryptosystem is also predictable. By way of contrast, genuinely random numbers that are only accessible to the intended encoder and decoder allow literally unbreakable encryption of a similar or lesser amount of meaningful data (using a simple exclusive OR operation) in a method known as the one-time pad, which has often insurmountable problems that are barriers to implementing this method correctly.

== History ==
Tables of random numbers have the desired properties no matter how chosen from the table: by row, column, diagonal or irregularly. The first such table was published by L. H. C. Tippett in 1927, and since then a number of other such tables were developed. The first tables were generated through a variety of ways—one (by L. H. C. Tippett) took its numbers "at random" from census registers, another (by R. A. Fisher and Francis Yates) used numbers taken "at random" from logarithm tables, and in 1939 a set of 100,000 digits were published by M. G. Kendall and B. Babington Smith produced by a specialized machine in conjunction with a human operator. In the mid-1940s, the RAND Corporation set about to develop a large table of random numbers for use with the Monte Carlo method, and using a hardware random number generator produced A Million Random Digits with 100,000 Normal Deviates. The RAND table used electronic simulation of a roulette wheel attached to a computer, the results of which were then carefully filtered and tested before being used to generate the table. The RAND table was an important breakthrough in delivering random numbers because such a large and carefully prepared table had never before been available (the largest previously published table was ten times smaller in size), and because it was also available on IBM punched cards, which allowed for its use in computers. In the 1950s, a hardware random number generator named ERNIE was used to draw British premium bond numbers.

The first "testing" of random numbers for statistical randomness was developed by M. G. Kendall and ] and B. Babington Smith in the late 1930s, and was based upon looking for certain types of probabilistic expectations in a given sequence. The simplest test looked to make sure that roughly equal numbers of 1s, 2s, 3s, etc. were present; more complicated tests looked for the number of digits between successive 0s and compared the total counts with their expected probabilities. Over the years more complicated tests were developed. Kendall and Smith also created the notion of "local randomness", whereby a given set of random numbers would be broken down and tested in segments. In their set of 100,000 numbers, for example, two of the thousands were somewhat less "locally random" than the rest, but the set as a whole would pass its tests. Kendall and Smith advised their readers not to use those particular thousands by themselves as a consequence.

Published tables still have niche uses, particularly in the performance of experimental music pieces that call for them, such as Vision (1959) and Poem (1960) by La Monte Young.

== See also ==
- A Million Random Digits with 100,000 Normal Deviates
- Kish grid
