= David Hand (statistician) =

British statistician

David Hand OBE FBA
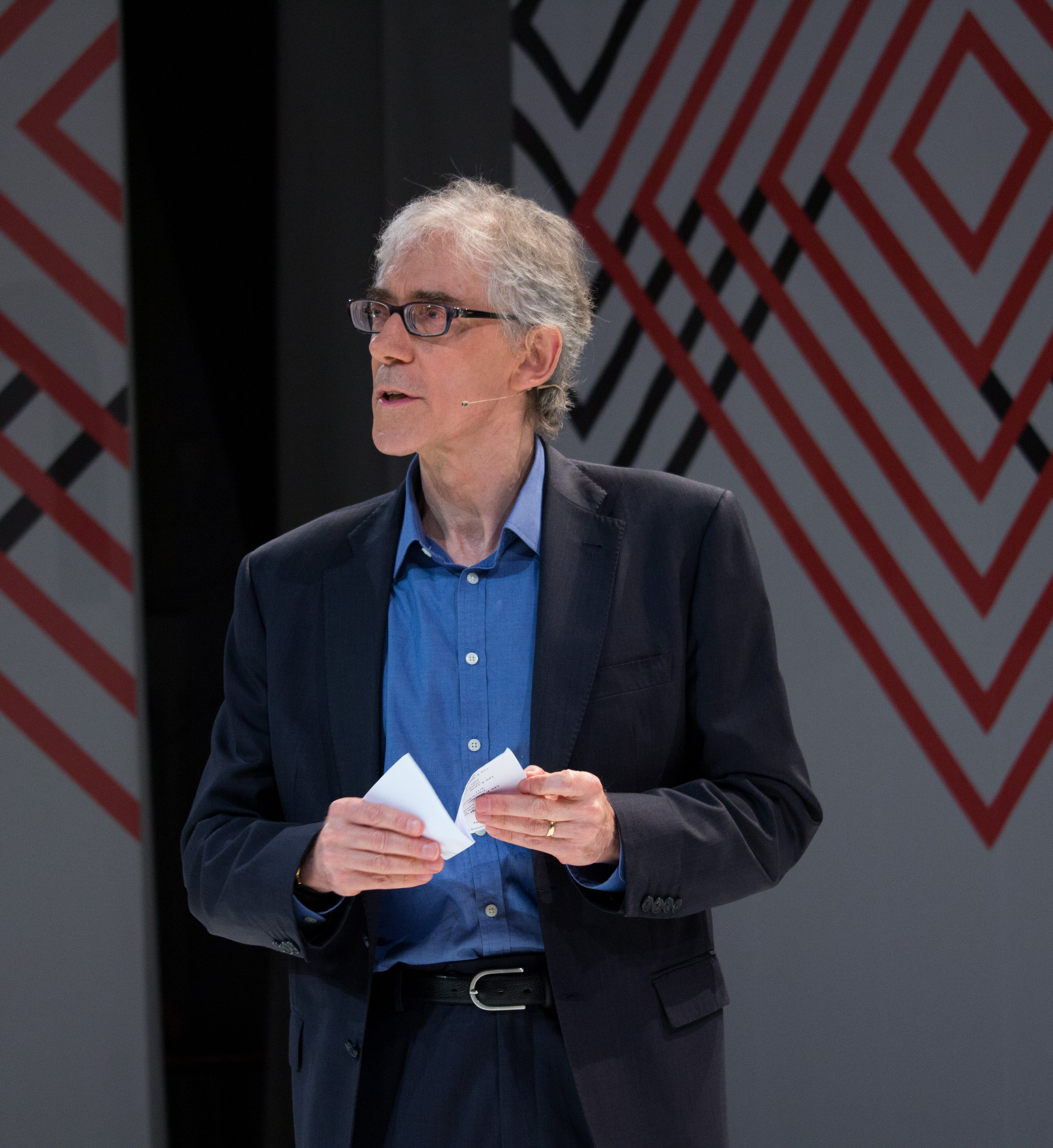
- Hand in 2015
- Born: David John Hand; 30 June 1950 (age 76); Peterborough, England
- Education: University of Oxford (BA); University of Southampton (PhD)
- Known for: Hand's paradox
- Awards: Guy Medal (2002); George Box Medal (2016)
- Scientific career
- Fields: Statistics; Machine learning Data mining Data science Big data
- Workplaces: Open University; Imperial College London; Winton Capital Management
- Thesis: The Classification of Incomplete Vectors (1977)
- Doctoral advisor: Bruce Godfrey Batchelor
- Website: www.imperial.ac.uk/people/d.j.hand

David John Hand OBE FBA (born 30 June 1950 in Peterborough) is a British statistician. His research interests include multivariate statistics, classification methods, pattern recognition, computational statistics and the foundations of statistics. He has written technical books on statistics, data mining, finance, classification methods, and measuring wellbeing, as well as science popularisation books including The Improbability Principle: Why Coincidences, Miracles, and Rare Events Happen Every Day; Dark Data: Why What You Don't Know Matters; and Statistics: A Very Short Introduction. In 1991 he launched the journal Statistics and Computing.

== Education ==
Hand was educated at the University of Oxford and the University of Southampton where he was awarded a PhD in 1977 for research supervised by Bruce Godfrey Batchelor.

== Career and research ==
Hand served as professor of statistics at the Open University from 1988 until 1999, when he moved to Imperial College London, where he is now Emeritus Professor of Mathematics. Between 2010 and 2018 he took an extended sabbatical to serve as chief scientific advisor at Winton Capital Management. He served as president of the Royal Statistical Society from 2008 to 2009, then again in 2010 after Bernard Silverman stood down.

=== Books ===
Hand has published 31 books, inter alia:

- 2001. Principles of Data Mining
- 2007. Measurement Theory and Practice: the World Through Quantification
- 2014. (with Paul Allin). The Wellbeing of Nations: Meaning, Motive and Measurement. Wiley.
- 2014. The Improbability Principle: Why Coincidences, Miracles and Rare Events Happen All the Time
- 2020. From GDP to Sustainable Wellbeing: Changing Statistics or Changing Lives?
- 2020. Dark Data: Why What You Don't Know Matters

=== Articles ===
Hand has published over 300 scientific articles, inter alia:

- Hand D.J. and Henley W.E. (1997) Statistical classification methods in consumer credit scoring: a review. Journal of the Royal Statistical Society, Series A, 160, 523-541
- Hand D.J., Blunt G., Kelly M.G., and Adams N.M. (2000) Data mining for fun and profit. Statistical Science, 15, 111-131
- Hand D.J. and Yu K. (2001) Idiot's Bayes - not so stupid after all? International Statistical Review, 69, 385-398
- Bolton R.J. and Hand D.J. (2002) Statistical fraud detection: a review. Statistical Science, 17, 235-255
- Hand D.J. (2006) Classifier technology and the illusion of progress (with discussion). Statistical Science, 21, 1-34
- 2008. Top 10 algorithms in data mining
- Hand D.J. (2009) Measuring classifier performance: a coherent alternative to the area under the ROC curve. Machine Learning, 77, 103-123
- Hand D.J. (2018) Statistical challenges of administrative and transaction data (with discussion). Journal of the Royal Statistical Society, Series A, 181, 555-605

=== Awards and honours ===
Hand has received various awards for his work, including being elected Honorary Fellow of the Institute of Actuaries in 1999, the Guy Medal in Silver of the Royal Statistical Society in 2002, the IEEE ICDM Outstanding Contributions Award in 2004, the Credit Collections and Risk Award for Contributions to the Credit Industry in 2012, the George Box Medal for Business and Industrial Statistics in 2016, and the International Federation of Classification Societies Research Medal in 2019. He was appointed Officer of the Order of the British Empire (OBE) in the 2013 New Year Honours for services to research and innovation. He was elected a Fellow of the British Academy (FBA) in 2003. He has been awarded Honorary Doctorates by the University of Waterloo and the Krakow University of Economics.

In April 2013 until June 2021 he served on the board of the board of the UK Statistics Authority as a non-executive director and served on the European Statistical Advisory Committee, advising the European Commission from 2016 to 2021. He chaired the Administrative Data Research Network from 2014 to 2017 and has served on many other advisory committees, including chairing the Advisory Board of the ONS's Centre for Applied Data Ethics and the National Statistician's Expert User Advisory Committee.
