= Random number book =

Cryptology tool

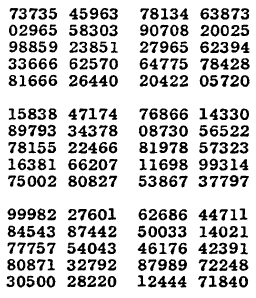
Lines 10580–10594, columns 21–40, from A Million Random Digits with 100,000 Normal Deviates

A random number book is a book whose main content is a large number of random numbers or random digits. These books were used in early cryptography and experimental design, and were published by the Rand Corporation and others.

== Background ==
The RAND Corporation book A Million Random Digits with 100,000 Normal Deviates was first published in 1955 and was reissued in 2001. A sequel, A Million And One Random Digits was published in 2022. Tables of random numbers have probably been used for multiple purposes at least since the Industrial Revolution. A table of random numbers was made by L.H.C. Tippett.

== Use ==
Random number books have been rendered obsolete for most purposes by the ready availability of random number generators running on electronic computers. However, they still have niche uses, particularly in the performance of experimental music pieces that call for them, such as Vision (1959) and Poem (1960) by La Monte Young.

== See also ==
- One-time pad
- Random number table
