= Igor Jurisica =

- Education: University of Toronto (Ph.D)
- Known for: Mapping Cancer Markers project
- Scientific career
- Fields: Computer science Computational biology
- Workplaces: University of Toronto; Princess Margaret Cancer Centre

Igor Jurisica is a Professor in the departments of Computer Science and Medical Biophysics at the University of Toronto. He is a Tier I Canada Research Chair in Integrative Cancer Informatics, and an associate editor for BMC Bioinformatics, Proteomes, Cancer Informatics, International Journal of Knowledge Discovery in Bioinformatics, and Interdisciplinary Sciences: Computational Life Sciences. In 2014, 2015 and 2016, he is an ISI Highly Cited Researcher.

== See also ==
- Computational biology
