= James E. Gentle =

American statistician and author (born 1943)

- Education: B.S in Mathematics M.C.S in Computer Science Ph.D. in Statistics
- Alma mater: University of North Carolina; Texas A&M University

James E. Gentle (born 1943) is an American statistician and author. He was a professor of statistics at George Mason University until his retirement in 2016. He is Co-Editor-in-Chief of Wiley Interdisciplinary Reviews: Computational Statistics and Senior Editor of Communications in Statistics.

Gentle has written nine books, several book chapters and many research papers. His research is focused on statistical computing, simulation, robust statistics, survey sampling, and computational finance. He is a fellow of the American Association for the Advancement of Science and a fellow of the American Statistical Association. He is an elected member of the International Statistical Institute.

== Early life ==
Gentle was born in Statesville, North Carolina. He received a B.S in Mathematics from University of North Carolina in 1966 followed by an M.C.S in Computer Science in 1973 and a Ph.D. in Statistics in 1974 from Texas A&M University under the supervision of Herman Otto Hartley.

== Career ==
Right after completing his Ph.D, Gentle joined the Iowa State University as an assistant professor of statistics. He was given tenure as an associate professor in 1978. A year later, he left Iowa State University to join IMSL, Inc., as the director of research and design. In 1992, Gentle left IMSL and joined George Mason University as university professor of computational statistics. During his career at Iowa State and George Mason, Gentle supervised 22 PhD dissertations.

In 1997, Gentle began a two-year leave from George Mason to serve as a program director in the Division of Mathematical Sciences of the National Science Foundation.

He has been a visiting professor at Texas A&M University, University of Texas at Dallas, Rice University, University of Texas at Arlington, and Harbin Institute of Technology Shenzhen Graduate School.

Throughout his career, Gentle has been active in the American Statistical Association, more specifically the Statistical Computing Section and the Statistical Graphics Section.

== Books ==
=== As an author ===
- Statistical Computing (with W. J. Kennedy,1980)
- Numerical Linear Algebra with Applications in Statistics (1998)
- Elements of Computational Statistics (2002)
- Random Number Generation and Monte Carlo Methods (2003)
- Computational Statistics (2009)
- Statistical Analysis of Financial Data (2020)
- Gentle Cooking (2023)
- Buen Provecho. Favorite Recipes from South of the Border --- and Beyond (2023)
- Matrix Algebra. Theory, Computations, and Applications in Statistics (2024)

=== As an editor ===
- Computer Science and Statistics: Proceedings of the Fifteenth Symposium on the Interface (1983)
- Handbook of Computational Finance (2012)
- Handbook of Computational Statistics (2012)
