= GLIM (software) =

GLIM (an acronym for Generalized Linear Interactive Modelling) is a statistical software program for fitting generalized linear models (GLMs). It was developed by the Royal Statistical Society's Working Party on Statistical Computing (later renamed the GLIM Working Party), chaired initially by John Nelder. It was first released in 1974 with the last major release, GLIM4, in 1993. GLIM was distributed by the Numerical Algorithms Group (NAG).

GLIM was notable for being the first package capable of fitting a wide range of generalized linear models in a unified framework, and for encouraging an interactive, iterative approach to statistical modelling. GLIM used a command-line interface and allowed users to define their own macros. Many articles in academic journals were written about the use of GLIM. Two GLIM conferences were held in London (1982) and Lancaster (1985) and the Statistical Modelling Society, with its annual workshops, grew out of them. GLIM was reviewed in The American Statistician in 1994, along with other software for fitting generalized linear models.

The GLIMPSE system was later developed to provide a knowledge based front-end for GLIM.

GLIM is no longer actively developed or distributed.

== Books ==
- Aitkin, Murray; Anderson, Dorothy; Francis, Brian; Hinde, John (1989). Statistical Modelling in GLIM. Oxford: Oxford University Press. ISBN 0-19-852203-7.
- Gilchrist, R.; Green, M. (1980). GLIM: a primer. Polytechnic of North London, Dept. of Mathematics.
- Healy, Michael J. R. (1988). GLIM: an introduction. Clarendon Press. ISBN 978-0-19-852213-3.
