= Computational Statistics (journal) =

- Discipline: Computational statistics
- Language: English
- Edited by: Philippe Vieu

Publication details
- Former name(s): Computational Statistics Quarterly
- History: 1986–present
- Publisher: Springer Science+Business Media
- Frequency: Quarterly
- Impact factor: 0.520 (2015)

Standard abbreviations
- ISO 4: Comput. Stat.
- MathSciNet: Comput. Statist.

Indexing
- CODEN: CSTAEB
- ISSN: 0943-4062 (print); 1613-9658 (web)
- LCCN: 95641008
- OCLC no.: 288979187

Links
- Journal homepage; Online access

Computational Statistics is a quarterly peer-reviewed scientific journal that publishes applications and research in the field of computational statistics, as well as reviews of hardware, software, and books. According to the Journal Citation Reports, the journal has a 2012 impact factor of 0.482. It was established in 1986 as Computational Statistics Quarterly and obtained its current title in 1992. The journal is published by Springer Science+Business Media and the editor-in-chief is Philippe Vieu.

== See also ==
- List of statistics journals
