= Rebecca Killick =

British statistician

Rebecca Killick is a British statistician whose work concerns non-stationary processes and changepoint detection. They are a professor of statistics at Lancaster University, an affiliate of the centre for health informatics, computing, and statistics in the Lancaster University Medical School, and co-editor-in-chief of the Journal of Statistical Software.

== Education and career ==
Killick completed a Ph.D. at Lancaster University in 2012, with the dissertation Novel methods for changepoint problems supervised by Idris Eckley.

After a year as a postdoctoral researcher, Killick returned to Lancaster University as a lecturer in mathematics and statistics in 2013, and added an affiliation with the centre for health informatics, computing, and statistics in 2021. They were promoted to full professor in 2022.

== Recognition ==
Killick was named as 2019 Young Statistician of the Year by the European Network for Business and Industrial Statistics. They were elected to the UK Young Academy in 2023, as part of its inaugural cohort of members.
