= Maurice Kendall =

British statistician

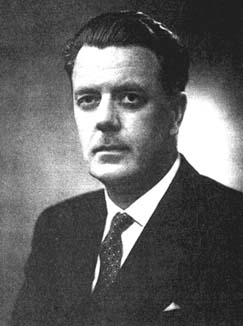
Sir Maurice George Kendall

Sir Maurice George Kendall, FBA (6 September 1907 – 29 March 1983) was a prominent British statistician. The Kendall tau rank correlation is named after him.

== Education and early life ==
Maurice Kendall was born in Kettering, Northamptonshire as the only child of engineering worker John Roughton Kendall and Georgina, née Brewer. His paternal grandfather was a publican, running The Woolpack at Kettering.

As a child, he survived cerebral meningitis, which was frequently fatal at that time. After growing up in Derby, England, he studied mathematics at St John's College, Cambridge, where he played cricket and chess (with future champions Conel Hugh O'Donel Alexander and Jacob Bronowski). After graduation as a Mathematics Wrangler in 1929, he joined the British Civil Service in the Ministry of Agriculture. In this position he became increasingly interested in using statistics towards agricultural questions, and one of his first published papers to the Royal Statistical Society involved studying crop productivity using factor analysis. He was elected a Fellow of the Society in 1934.

== Work in statistics ==
In 1938 and 1939 he began work, along with Bernard Babington-Smith known as BBS, on the question of random number generation, developing both one of the first early mechanical devices to produce random digits, and formulated a series of tests for statistical randomness in a given set of digits which, with some small modifications, became fairly widely used. He produced one of the second large collections of random digits (100,000 in total, over twice as many as those published by L. H. C. Tippett in 1927), which was a commonly used tract until the publication of RAND Corporation's A Million Random Digits with 100,000 Normal Deviates in 1955 (which was developed with a roulette wheel-like machine very similar to Kendall's and verified as "random" using his statistical tests).

In 1937, he aided the ageing statistician G. Udny Yule in the revision of his standard statistical textbook, Introduction to the Theory of Statistics, commonly known for many years as "Yule and Kendall". The two had met by chance in 1935, and were on close terms until Yule's death in 1951 (Yule was godfather to Kendall's second son).

During this period he also began work on the rank correlation coefficient which currently bears his name (Kendall's tau), which eventually led to a monograph on Rank Correlation in 1948.

In the late 1930s, he was additionally part of a group of five other statisticians who endeavoured to produce a reference work summarising recent developments in statistical theory, but it was cancelled on account of onset of World War II.

== War-time efforts ==
Kendall became Assistant general manager to the British Chamber of Shipping by day and had air-raid warden duties by night. Despite these constraints on his time, he managed to produce volume one of The Advanced Theory of Statistics in 1943 and a second volume in 1946.

During the war he also produced a series of papers extending to work of R.A. Fisher on the theory of k-statistics, and developed a number of extensions to this work through the 1950s. After the war, he worked on the theory and practice of time series analysis, and conclusively demonstrated (with the meager computing resources available at the time) that unsmoothed sample periodograms were unreliable estimators for the population spectrum.

== London School of Economics ==
In 1949 he accepted the second chair of statistics at the London School of Economics, University of London. Here he worked part-time as the director of the new Research Techniques Division. From 1952 to 1957 he edited a two-volume work on Statistical Sources in the United Kingdom, which was a standard reference until the mid-1970s. In the 1950s he also worked on multivariate analysis, and developed the text Multivariate Analysis in 1957. In 1957, he also developed, with W. R. Buckland, a Dictionary of Statistical Terms, aimed at helping making the tools of statistics more available to potential users in industry and government.

In 1953, he published "The Analytics of Economic Time Series, Part 1: Prices" in which he suggested that the movement of shares on the stock market was random (as likely to go up on a certain day as to go down). These results were disturbing to some financial economists and further debate and research then followed. This ultimately led to the creation of the random walk hypothesis, and the closely related efficient-market hypothesis which states that random price movements indicate a well-functioning or efficient market.

== CEIR and WFS ==
In 1961 he left the University of London and took a position as the managing director (later chairman) of a consulting company, CEIR (later known as Scientific Control Systems), and in the same year began a two-year term as president of the Royal Statistical Society. In the 1960s he published and co-edited a number of volumes and monographs in statistical theory.

In 1972, he became director of the World Fertility Survey, a project sponsored by the International Statistical Institute and the United Nations which aimed to study fertility in developed and developing nations. He continued this work until 1980, when illness forced him to retire.

== Honours ==
He was knighted by the British government in 1974 for his services to the theory of statistics, and received a medal from the United Nations in 1980 in recognition for his work on the World Fertility Survey. He was also elected a fellow of the British Academy and received the highest honour of the Royal Statistical Society, the Guy Medal in Gold.

He additionally had served as president of the Operational Research Society, the Institute of Statisticians, and was elected a fellow of the American Statistical Association, the Institute of Mathematical Statistics, the Econometric Society, and the British Computer Society.

At the time of his death in 1983, he was honorary president of the International Statistical Institute.

== Family ==
Kendall's first wife, Sheila (née Lester), predeceased him. He was survived by their daughter and two sons, and by his second wife, Ruth (née Whitfield) and their son.
