= Bernard Babington Smith =

British academic, wartime intelligence officer and amateur athlete

Personal information
- Nationality: British (English/Scottish)
- Born: 26 October 1905 London
- Died: 23 September 1993 (aged 87)
- Education: Eton College; King's College, Cambridge
- Parents: Sir Henry Babington Smith (father); Lady Elizabeth Bruce (mother)

Sport
- Sport: Athletics
- Event: Pole Vault / Fencing
- Club: London AC

Bernard Babington Smith, OBE (26 October 1905 – 23 September 1993) was a British academic, wartime intelligence officer and amateur athlete.

== Early life and education ==
He was born on 26 October 1905 at 29 Hyde Park Gate, London, the son of Sir Henry Babington Smith and Lady Elizabeth Bruce, daughter of Victor Bruce, 9th Earl of Elgin, 13th Earl of Kincardine and former Viceory of India. He was educated at Eton College, where he was Captain of School and King's College, Cambridge. He was one of 10 children and his siblings included the banker Michael Babington Smith and Constance Babington Smith, a biographer and wartime intelligence officer. Another sister, Lucy, married Henry Sinclair, 2nd Baron Pentland.

== Athletics ==
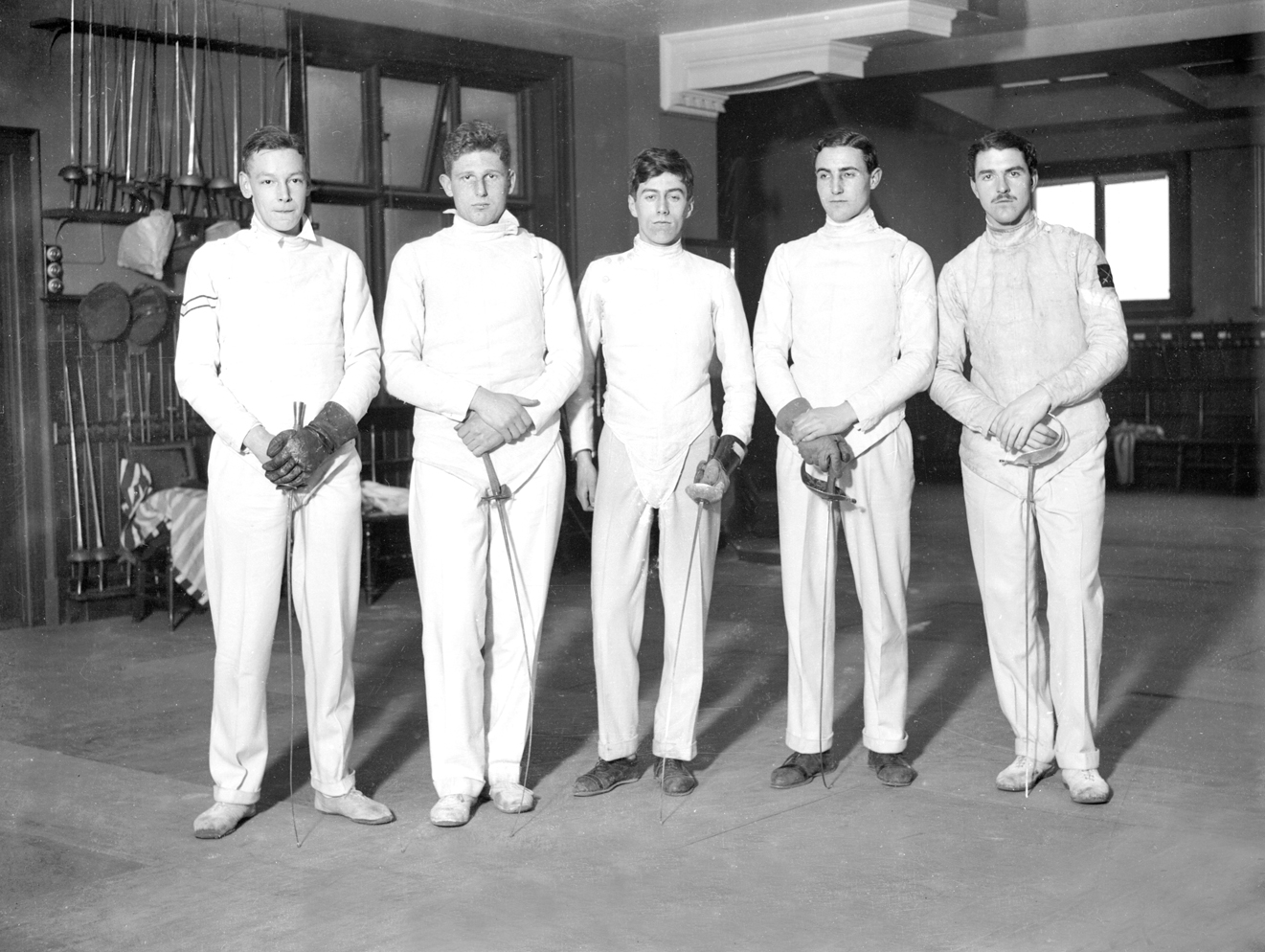
Bernard Babington Smith (far right) Cambridge University Fencing Team 1928

Shortly before the 1930 British Empire Games in Canada, Smith finished third behind Age van der Zee and Henry Lindblad in the pole jump event at the 1930 AAA Championships. He then competed in the pole vault at the 1930 British Empire Games for England. He also fenced for both England and Scotland.

== Wartime Intelligence Service ==
At the outbreak of World War II, Babington Smith was a lecturer specialising in statistics in the Department of Experimental Psychology at the University of St Andrews. He joined the RAF Volunteer Reserve in October 1940. He asked his colleague, mathematician Walter Ledermann to visit his mother Lady Elizabeth, who lived nearby, on Sunday nights so that she would not be lonely.

On 1 November he was granted a commission "for the duration of the hostilities" and given the rank of Pilot Officer on probation, which was duly announced in The London Gazette. Among his first duties and basic training was detachment to Coventry to assist with the clearing up process after the German air raid in November 1940. He was initially posted to 3 Photo Reconnaissance Unit (PRU) at RAF Oakington as the deputy intelligence officer, arriving on 1 December 1940 The unit, commanded by his close friend Squadron Leader Pat Ogilvie, supported RAF Bomber Command. Babington Smith quickly became involved in the interpretation of the night photographs taken by bombers during the raid, learning how to identify and locate anti-aircraft defences from searchlights and gun flashes as well as the course of the raid from bomb explosions. It became clear to him that the accuracy of the bombing was appalling and he had the unpleasant duty briefing this fact to Sir Arthur 'Bomber' Harris. His researches led to the establishment of Professor Frederick Lindemann's enquiry (also known as the Butt Report) into bombing accuracy.

In August 1941, he was promoted to the rank of "war substantive" Flying Officer. In mid-1941 he was posted to the Central Interpretation Unit (CIU) at RAF Medmenham, where his sister Constance Babington Smith was also stationed. He was tasked with setting up a Night Photographic Section. As the size of the bombing raids grew, the volume of imagery grew exponentially. Bernard, a trained statistician, developed a system for the selection of photography to be interpreted after each raid which enabled his section to cope. Unlike most sections in Medmenham, the interpreters in the night section did not use stereo images, but its expertise became widely recognised and appreciated. Members of the section frequently visited Bomber Command Headquarters to brief Sir Arthur 'Bomber' Harris. Bernard was mentioned in despatches four times and awarded an OBE.

== Academic career ==
He was a fellow of Pembroke College, Oxford and Senior Lecturer in Experimental Psychology at the University of Oxford.

In 1938 and 1939 he worked with Maurice Kendall on the question of random number generation. They developed both one of the first early mechanical devices to produce random digits, and formulated a series of tests for statistical randomness in a given set of digits which, with some small modifications, became fairly widely used. They also produced one of the second large collections of random digits (100,000 in total, over twice as many as those published by L. H. C. Tippett in 1927), which was a commonly used tract until the publication of RAND Corporation's A Million Random Digits with 100,000 Normal Deviates in 1955.

In later career he became interested in training managers and collaborated with Ralph Coverdale, a co-operation which developed in time to become the Coverdale Organisation, a management training business. Babington Smith's ideas on training were later condensed into the book Manager and Team Development.

== Personal life ==
He married Helen Elizabeth Crocket, PhD. on the 5 October 1940. They had two sons and a daughter. In 1952 he and his wife purchased and restored Yelford Manor in Oxfordshire. He died in Oxford on the 24 August 1993.

A collection of the Babington Smith family correspondence were deposited in the archives of Trinity College, Cambridge by Babington Smith and his sister Elizabeth Lloyd Jones.

== Ancestry ==
Ancestors of Bernard Babington Smith

16. Archibald Smith of Jordanhill
8. James Smith of Jordanhill
17. Isobel Euing
4. Archibald Smith of Jordanhill
18. Alexander Wilson
9. Mary Wilson
19. Christina Lawrie
2. Sir Henry Babington Smith
20. Charles Stuart Parker
10. Sir James Parker
21. Mary Rainey
5. Susan Emma Parker
22. Thomas Babington of Rothley Temple
11. Mary Babington
23. Jean Macaulay
1. Bernard Babington Smith
24. Thomas Bruce, 7th Earl of Elgin
12. James Bruce, 8th Earl of Elgin
25. Elizabeth Oswald
6. Victor Bruce, 9th Earl of Elgin
26. John Lambton, 1st Earl of Durham
13. Lady Mary Louisa Lambton
27. Lady Louisa Grey
3. Lady Elisabeth Mary Bruce
28. Sir James Carnegie, 5th Baronet
14. James Carnegie, 9th Earl of Southesk
29. Charlotte Lysons
7. Lady Constance Mary Carnegie
30. Charles Noel, 1st Earl of Gainsborough
15. Lady Catherine Hamilton Noel
31. Arabella Hamlyn-Williams

== Bibliography ==
- Babington Smith, Constance (1958). Evidence in Camera: The Story of Photographic Intelligence in World War II (Reprint ed.). London: Chatto and Windus. ISBN 9780715363133.
