= Statistical Modelling Society =

The Statistical Modelling Society (SMS) is an international society of statisticians, which, according to its statutes, will promote statistical modelling as the general framework for the application of statistical ideas; promote important developments, extensions, and applications in statistical modelling; and bring together statisticians working on statistical modelling from various disciplines. The principal activity of the society are the workshops, which are held annually under the name `International Workshop on Statistical Modelling' at varying locations. The society has approximately 160 active members. The society publishes its own journal, Statistical Modelling. The society holds bi-annual elections to elect an executive committee.

== History ==
The Statistical Modelling Society was founded in June 2003. It was preceded by its journal (which was launched in 2001) and the workshops, which were first held in 1986. The origins of the society lie in Austria, the UK and Italy, where the first workshops were held. These early meetings had their main focus on developments in generalized linear models and particularly the software GLIM.
