= Kaye Basford =

Australian statistician and biometrician

Kaye Basford AM
- Born: 10 August 1952 (age 74); Ipswich, Queensland, Australia
- Title: Professor of Biometry
- Awards: Australian Medal for Agricultural Science

Academic background
- Education: University of Queensland
- Thesis: Cluster Analysis via Normal Mixture Models (1985)
- Doctoral advisor: Geoffrey McLachlan and Don Byth

Academic work
- Discipline: Statistics; Biometrics
- Sub-discipline: Application of statistical methods to plant genetics
- Institutions: University of Queensland

Kaye Enid Basford AM (born 10 August 1952) is an Australian statistician and biometrician who applies statistical methods to plant genetics. She is a professor in the School of Biomedical Sciences at the University of Queensland, and head of the school. She was president of the Statistical Society of Australia from 2005 to 2007, and president of the International Biometric Society from 2010 to 2011. Before moving to Biomedical Sciences, she was the head of the School of Land, Crop and Food Sciences at the University of Queensland from 2001 to 2010.

After earning her B.Sc. (Hon) she worked for the Dental School, University of Queensland, Brisbane, Australia, contributing many papers on dentistry.

Basford earned her Ph.D. in 1985 from the School of Physical Sciences at the University of Queensland. Her dissertation, jointly supervised by Geoffrey McLachlan and Don Byth, was Cluster Analysis via Normal Mixture Models.

With McLachlan, Basford is the author of a book on mixture models, Mixture Models: Inference and Applications to Clustering (Marcel Dekker, 1988). With John Tukey she wrote Graphical Analysis of Multiresponse Data: Illustrated with a Plant Breeding Trial (Chapman & Hall / CRC, 1999.

In 1998, the Australian Institute of Agricultural Science and Technology awarded Basford the Australian Medal for Agricultural Science. She was elected in 2006 as a fellow of the Australian Academy of Technological Sciences and Engineering (AATSE) and is vice-president of the AATSE. In 2010 she became a life member of the Statistical Society of Australia. She is also a fellow of the Institute of Statisticians and an elected member of the International Statistical Institute.
