= Kim-Anh Do =

Australian biostatistician

Kim-Anh Do is an Australian biostatistician of Vietnamese descent. She is the chair of the Department of Biostatistics in the University of Texas MD Anderson Cancer Center, and the holder of the Electa C. Taylor Chair for Cancer Research at the center. She also holds adjunct professorships at Texas A&M University and Rice University.

Do did her undergraduate studies at the University of Queensland, in mathematics and computer science. She then went to Stanford University for graduate study in statistics. She completed her Ph.D. in 1990 with a dissertation Some Results in Statistical Modeling and Estimation for Software Reliability Problems supervised by Jerome H. Friedman.

With Geoffrey McLachlan and Christophe Ambroise, Do is the author of Analyzing Microarray Gene Expression Data (Wiley, 2004).

Do is a fellow of the American Association for the Advancement of Science, the American Statistical Association, and the Royal Statistical Society. She is an elected member of the International Statistical Institute.
