= Ralph Coverdale =

British management consultant

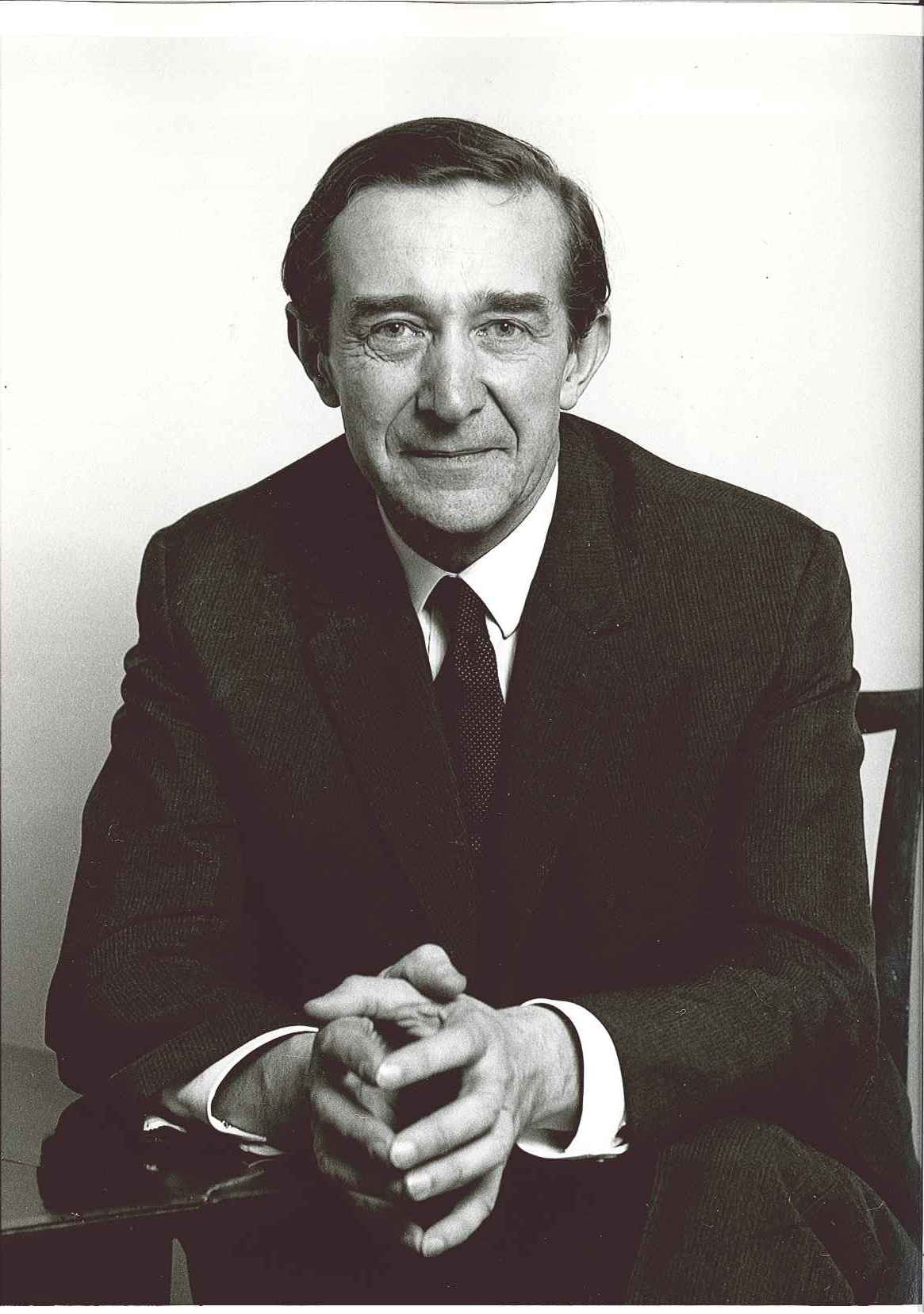
- Born: 1918
- Died: February 1975 (aged 56–57)
- Occupations: Soldier, psychologist, management consultant and trainer
- Known for: Coaching and The Coverdale Organization

Ralph Coverdale (1918–1975) was a British soldier, psychologist and business consultant. He established The Coverdale Organization and the Coverdale Training method. He has been credited as a founder of coaching as a business practice in British industry.

Coverdale worked for years with experimental psychologist Bernard Babington Smith to develop the Coverdale Training method, a method of learning through action—later termed 'action learning' or 'inductive learning'.

Ralph Coverdale died in 1975 at 56 after being diagnosed with lung cancer.

== Early life ==
Ralph Coverdale's remote ancestor, Miles Coverdale, was one of the first Protestant translators of the Bible. Later on the family converted to Roman Catholicism, with family members joining various religious communities as priests and nuns.

He was educated at Beaumont Jesuit College in Berkshire, England. At age 18 he attended Heythrop College, University of London to become a Jesuit novice. In 1942, however, he decided to leave college and enlist in the army, serving until 1947.

Coverdale then went to St Catherine's College, Oxford where he read psychology under Bernard Babington Smith, who specialized in the nature of human perception. Smith would later become his advisor and business colleague.

== Career ==
Beginning in 1950, Coverdale spent the following five years working for various organizations in the field of opinion polling and psychological research.

In 1955, he joined the Steel Company of Wales as an Executive Development Officer and started his work on what would later become the Coverdale Training method.

In 1960, he moved to Esso as Head of Management Studies, a position he would hold for more than four years, before setting up his own company, The Coverdale Organisation, in 1965.

Coverdale's training went beyond the United Kingdom. His final series of courses were held in Washington, D.C. After his return, he suffered from severe headaches that was eventually diagnosed as being caused by lung cancer. He died in February 1975 at the age of 56.

John Harvey-Jones, who took Coverdale Training method at Imperial Chemical Industries, would later describe Coverdale as a "management genius".

== Views ==
Coverdale and Smith believed that business-minded thinking and management were skills that could be developed. This challenged the orthodox view at the time that believed that people had fixed skill sets and an unchangeable IQ.

Coverdale also viewed that cooperation and mutual benefit was more productive than conflict and competition.

He had a mistrust of prolonged analysis, instead seeing it as a tool to encourage synthesis and action. His training approach reflected this, asserting that skills were not taught like knowledge but instead learned from experience.

== Bibliography ==
- Risk Thinking – (1997), The Coverdale Organization (Posthumously) (ISBN 0950560618)
