= Statistical randomness =

Quality of a numerical sequence of having no recognizable patterns

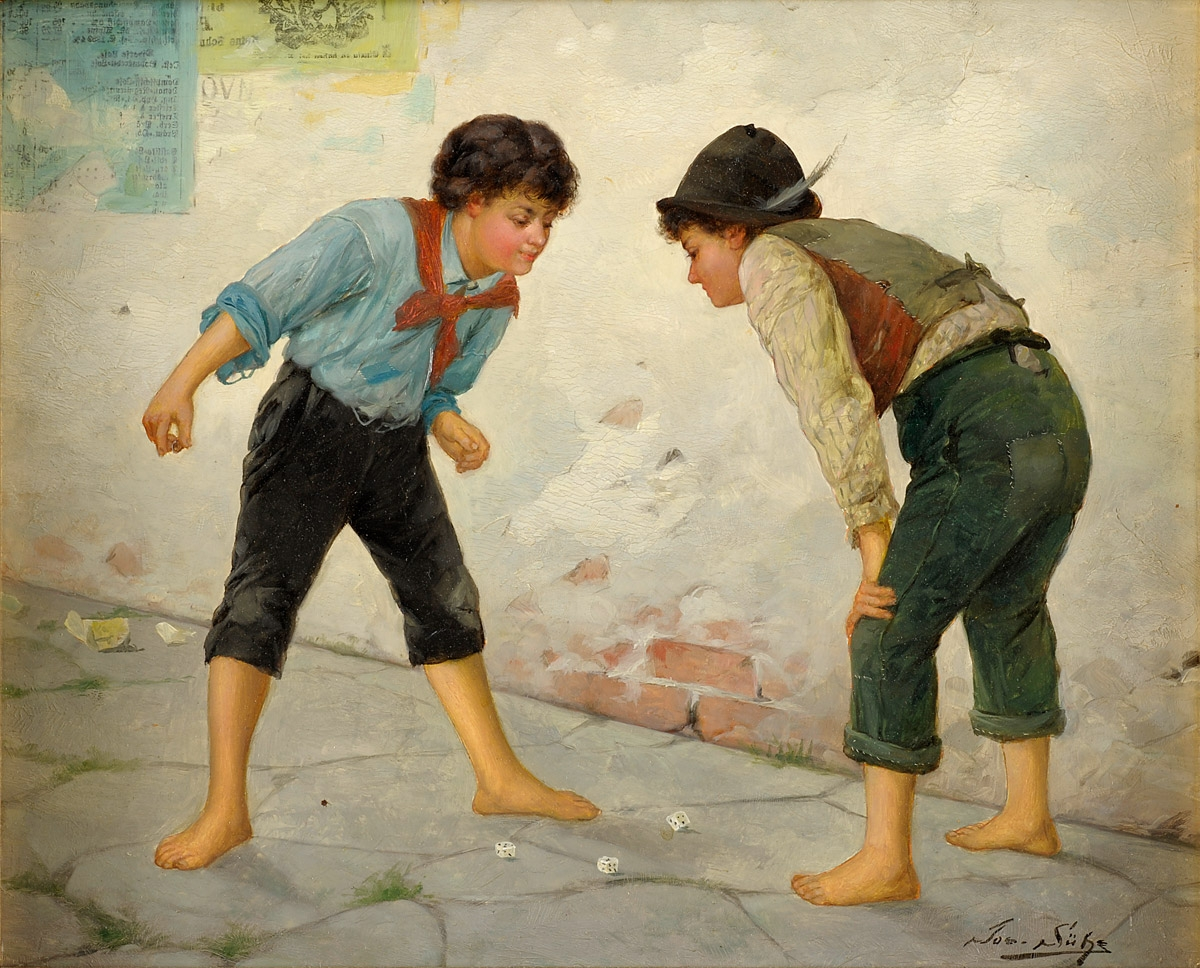
Dice rolls are a standard example of statistical randomness.

A numeric sequence is said to be statistically random when it contains no recognizable patterns or regularities; sequences such as the results of an ideal dice roll or the digits of π exhibit statistical randomness.

Statistical randomness does not necessarily imply "true" randomness, i.e., objective unpredictability. Pseudorandomness is sufficient for many uses, such as statistics, hence the name statistical randomness.

Global randomness and local randomness are different. Most philosophical conceptions of randomness are global—because they are based on the idea that "in the long run" a sequence looks truly random, even if certain sub-sequences would not look random. In a "truly" random sequence of numbers of sufficient length, for example, it is probable there would be long sequences of nothing but repeating numbers, though on the whole the sequence might be random. Local randomness refers to the idea that there can be minimum sequence lengths in which random distributions are approximated. Long stretches of the same numbers, even those generated by "truly" random processes, would diminish the "local randomness" of a sample (it might only be locally random for sequences of 10,000 numbers; taking sequences of less than 1,000 might not appear random at all, for example).

A sequence exhibiting a pattern is not thereby proved not statistically random. According to principles of Ramsey theory, sufficiently large objects must necessarily contain a given substructure ("complete disorder is impossible").

Legislation concerning gambling imposes certain standards of statistical randomness to slot machines.

== Tests ==
The first tests for random numbers were published by M.G. Kendall and Bernard Babington Smith in the Journal of the Royal Statistical Society in 1938. They were built on statistical tools such as Pearson's chi-squared test that were developed to distinguish whether experimental phenomena matched their theoretical probabilities. Pearson developed his test originally by showing that a number of dice experiments by W.F.R. Weldon did not display "random" behavior.

Kendall and Smith's original four tests were hypothesis tests, which took as their null hypothesis the idea that each number in a given random sequence had an equal chance of occurring, and that various other patterns in the data should be also distributed equiprobably.

- The frequency test, was very basic: checking to make sure that there were roughly the same number of 0s, 1s, 2s, 3s, etc.
- The serial test, did the same thing but for sequences of two digits at a time (00, 01, 02, etc.), comparing their observed frequencies with their hypothetical predictions were they equally distributed.
- The poker test, tested for certain sequences of five numbers at a time (AAAAA, AAAAB, AAABB, etc.) based on hands in the game poker.
- The gap test, looked at the distances between zeroes (00 would be a distance of 0, 030 would be a distance of 1, 02250 would be a distance of 3, etc.).

If a given sequence was able to pass all of these tests within a given degree of significance (generally 5%), then it was judged to be, in their words "locally random". Kendall and Smith differentiated "local randomness" from "true randomness" in that many sequences generated with truly random methods might not display "local randomness" to a given degree — very large sequences might contain many rows of a single digit. This might be "random" on the scale of the entire sequence, but in a smaller block it would not be "random" (it would not pass their tests), and would be useless for a number of statistical applications.

As random number sets became more and more common, more tests, of increasing sophistication were used. Some modern tests plot random digits as points on a three-dimensional plane, which can then be rotated to look for hidden patterns. In 1995, the statistician George Marsaglia created a set of tests known as the diehard tests, which he distributes with a CD-ROM of 5 billion pseudorandom numbers. In 2015, Yongge Wang distributed a Java software package for statistically distance based randomness testing.

Pseudorandom number generators require tests as exclusive verifications for their "randomness," as they are decidedly not produced by "truly random" processes, but rather by deterministic algorithms. Over the history of random number generation, many sources of numbers thought to appear "random" under testing have later been discovered to be very non-random when subjected to certain types of tests. The notion of quasi-random numbers was developed to circumvent some of these problems, though pseudorandom number generators are still extensively used in many applications (even ones known to be extremely "non-random"), as they are "good enough" for most applications.

Other tests:

- The Monobit test treats each output bit of the random number generator as a coin flip test, and determine if the observed number of heads and tails are close to the expected 50% frequency. The number of heads in a coin flip trail forms a binomial distribution.
- The Wald–Wolfowitz runs test tests for the number of bit transitions between 0 bits, and 1 bits, comparing the observed frequencies with expected frequency of a random bit sequence.
- Information entropy
- Autocorrelation test
- Kolmogorov–Smirnov test
- Statistically distance based randomness test. Yongge Wang showed that NIST SP800-22 testing standards are not sufficient to detect some weakness in randomness generators and proposed statistically distance based randomness test.
- Spectral Density Estimation - performing a Fourier transform on a "random" signal transforms it into a sum of periodic functions in order to detect non random repetitive trends
- Maurer's Universal Statistical Test
- The Diehard tests

== See also ==
- Algorithmic randomness
- Complete spatial randomness
- Normal number
- One-time pad
- Random error
- Randomness
- Randomness tests
- Statistical hypothesis testing
- Seven states of randomness
- TestU01
- Mersenne Twister
- Clustering illusion
