= Pseudorandomness =

Appearing random but actually being generated by a deterministic, causal process

A pseudorandom sequence of numbers is one that appears to be statistically random, despite having been produced by a completely deterministic and repeatable process. Pseudorandom number generators are often used in computer programming, as traditional sources of randomness available to humans (such as rolling dice) rely on physical processes not readily available to computer programs, although developments in hardware random number generator technology have challenged this.

== Background ==
The generation of random numbers has many uses, such as for random sampling, Monte Carlo methods, board games, or gambling. In physics, however, most processes, such as gravitational acceleration, are deterministic, meaning that they always produce the same outcome from the same starting point. Some notable exceptions are radioactive decay and quantum measurement, which are both modeled as being truly random processes in the underlying physics. Since these processes are not practical sources of random numbers, pseudorandom numbers are used, which ideally have the unpredictability of a truly random sequence, despite being generated by a deterministic process.

In many applications, the deterministic process is a computer algorithm called a pseudorandom number generator, which must first be provided with a number called a random seed. Since the same seed will yield the same sequence every time, it is important that the seed be well chosen and kept hidden, especially in security applications, where the pattern's unpredictability is a critical feature.

In some cases where it is important for the sequence to be demonstrably unpredictable, physical sources of random numbers have been used, such as radioactive decay, atmospheric electromagnetic noise harvested from a radio tuned between stations, or intermixed timings of keystrokes. The time investment needed to obtain these numbers leads to a compromise: using some of these physics readings as a seed for a pseudorandom number generator.

== History ==
Before modern computing, researchers requiring random numbers would either generate them through various means (dice, cards, roulette wheels, etc.) or use existing random number tables.

The first attempt to provide researchers with a ready supply of random digits was in 1927, when the Cambridge University Press published a table of 41,600 digits developed by L.H.C. Tippett. In 1947, the RAND Corporation generated numbers by the electronic simulation of a roulette wheel; the results were eventually published in 1955 as A Million Random Digits with 100,000 Normal Deviates.

== In computational complexity ==
In theoretical computer science, a distribution is pseudorandom against a class of adversaries if no adversary from the class can distinguish it from the uniform distribution with significant advantage. This notion of pseudorandomness is studied in computational complexity theory and has applications to cryptography.

Formally, let S and T be finite sets and let F = {f: S → T} be a class of functions. A distribution D over S is ε-pseudorandom against F if for every f in F, the statistical distance between the distributions $f(X)$ and $f(Y)$, where $X$ is sampled from D and $Y$ is sampled from the uniform distribution on S, is at most ε.

In typical applications, the class F describes a model of computation with bounded resources and one is interested in designing distributions D with certain properties that are pseudorandom against F. The distribution D is often specified as the output of a pseudorandom generator.

== See also ==
- Assortativity – Tendency for similar nodes to be connected
- Cryptographically secure pseudorandom number generator – Type of functions designed for being unsolvable by root-finding algorithms
- List of random number generators
- Pseudorandom binary sequence – Seemingly random, difficult to predict bit stream created by a deterministic algorithm
- Pseudorandom ensemble
- Pseudorandom number generator – Algorithm that generates an approximation of a random number sequence
- Low-discrepancy sequence – Type of mathematical sequence
- Random number generation – Creating sequence of numbers that cannot be predicted
- Pseudorandom noise – Pseudo-random signal with characteristics similar to noise
- Transfinite number – Number that is larger than all finite numbers
