= Wiley Interdisciplinary Reviews: Computational Statistics =

Wiley Interdisciplinary Reviews: Computational Statistics (WIREs Comp Stats) is a review journal for computational and statistical techniques in the sciences, from the perspectives of both computation and statistics. It contain both tutorial reviews and advanced reviews, as well as opinion pieces and commentaries.

The journal was published by John Wiley & Sons both in print (ISSN 1939-5108) and online (ISSN 1939-0068) through 2011. Beginning in 2012, it is published online only. It was started in 2009.

== Editors in chief ==
The initial editors in chief were Edward J. Wegman and Yasmin H. Said of George Mason University, and David W. Scott, of Rice University. As of 2013, the current editors in chief are James E. Gentle, university professor of computational statistics at George Mason University, Karen Kafadar, Rudy Professor of Statistics at Indiana University and David W. Scott, Noah Harding Professor of Statistics at Rice University.

== Indexing ==
The journal is indexed in Compendex and Scopus.
