= Journal of Statistical Computation and Simulation =

- Discipline: Statistics
- Language: English

Publication details
- History: 1972-present
- Publisher: Taylor & Francis
- Frequency: 18/year
- Impact factor: 0.767 (2018)

Standard abbreviations
- ISO 4: J. Stat. Comput. Simul.

Indexing
- ISSN: 0094-9655 (print); 1563-5163 (web)
- OCLC no.: 1793216

Links
- Journal homepage; Online access; Online archive

The Journal of Statistical Computation and Simulation is a peer-reviewed scientific journal that covers computational statistics. It is published by Taylor & Francis and was established in 1972. The editors-in-chief are Richard Krutchkoff (Virginia Polytechnic Institute and State University, Blacksburg) and Andrei Volodin (University of Regina).

== Abstracting and indexing ==
The journal is abstracted and indexed in:

- Current Index to Statistics
- Science Citation Index Expanded
- Zentralblatt MATH

According to the Journal Citation Reports, the journal has a 2018 impact factor of 0.767.
