= Social data science =

Academic area of study and research, combining social science and technology

Social data science is an interdisciplinary field that addresses social science problems by applying or designing computational and digital methods. As the name implies, Social Data Science is located primarily within the social science, but it relies on technical advances in fields like data science, network science, and computer science. The data in Social Data Science is always about human beings and derives from social phenomena, and it could be structured data (e.g. surveys) or unstructured data (e.g. digital footprints). The goal of Social Data Science is to yield new knowledge about social networks, human behavior, cultural ideas and political ideologies. A social data scientist combines domain knowledge and specialized theories from the social sciences with programming, statistical and other data analysis skills.

== Methods ==
Social data science employs a wide range of quantitative - both established methods in social science as well as new methods developed in computer science and interdisciplinary data science fields such as natural language processing (NLP) and network science. Social Data Science is closely related to Computational Social Science, but also sometimes includes qualitative data, and mixed digital methods.

Common social data science methods include:

Quantitative methods:

- Machine learning
- Deep learning
- Social network analysis
- Randomized controlled trials
- Natural language processing (NLP), especially through text as data.
- surveys

Qualitative methods:

- Interviewing
- Observation
- Ethnography
- Content analysis
- Discourse analysis

Mixed digital methods:

- Controversy mapping
- Spatial analysis
- Quali-quantitative methods
- Computational ethnography

One of the pillars of social data science is in the combination of qualitative and quantitative data to analyze social phenomena and develop computationally grounded theories. For example, by using mixed methods to digitize qualitative data and analyzing it via computational methods, or by qualitatively analyzing and interpreting quantitative data.

=== Data ===
Social data scientists use both digitized data (e.g. old books that have been digitized) and natively digital data (e.g. social media posts). Since such data often take the form of found data that were originally produced for other purposes (commercial, governance, etc.) than research, data scraping, cleaning and other forms of preprocessing and data mining occupy a substantial part of a social data scientist's job.

Sources of SDS data include:

- Text data
- Sensor data
- Register data
- Survey data
- Geo-location data
- Observational data

== Relations to other fields ==
=== Social sciences ===
Social data science is part of the social sciences along with established disciplines (anthropology, economics, political science, psychology, and sociology) and newer interdisciplinary fields like behavioral science, criminology, international relations, and cognitive science. As such, its fundamental unit of study is social relations, human behavior and cultural ideas, which it investigates by using quantitative and/or qualitative data and methods to develop, test and improve fundamental theories concerning the nature of the human condition. SDS also differs from traditional social science in two ways.

1. First, its primary object is digitized phenomena and data in the widest sense of this word, ranging from digitized text corpora to the footprints gathered by digital platforms and sensors.
2. Secondly, more than simply applying existing quantitative and qualitative social science methods, social data science seeks to develop and disrupt these via the import and integration of state of the art of data science techniques

=== Data Science ===
Social data science is a form of data science in that it applies advanced computational methods and statistics to gain information and insights from data. Social data science researchers often make use of methods developed by data scientists, such as data mining and machine learning, which includes but is not limited to the extraction and processing of information from big data sources. Unlike the broader field of data science, which involves any application and study involving the combination of computational and statistical methods, social data science mainly concerns the scientific study of digital social data and/or digital footprints from human behavior.

=== Computational Social Science ===
Like computational social science, social data science uses data science methods to solve social science problems. This includes the reappropriation and refinement of methods developed by data scientists to better fit the questions and data of the social sciences as well as their specialized domain knowledge and theories. Unlike computational social science, social data science also includes critical studies of how digital platforms and computational processes affect wider society and of how computational and non-computational approaches integrate and combine.

=== Digital Methods ===
While most social data science researchers are closely affiliated with or part of computational social science, some qualitative oriented social data scientists are influenced by the fields of digital humanities and digital methods that emerged from science and technology studies (STS). Like digital methods, the aim is here to repurpose the 'methods of the medium' to study digitally-mediated society and to engage in an ongoing discussions about bias in science and society by bringing computational social science and Digital Methods into dialogue. SDS is also related to digital sociology and digital anthropology, but to a higher degree aspires to augment qualitative data and digital methods with state of the art data science techniques.

== History of the field ==
The origin of term "social data science" coincided with the emergence of a number of research centers and degree programs. In 2016, the Copenhagen Center for Social Data Science (SODAS) - the first academic institution using the SDS name - was launched at the University of Copenhagen. The plan for an interdisciplinary center working at the intersection of the social and computational sciences was rooted in the Copenhagen Networks Study from 2011 to 2016 by researchers from the Technical University of Denmark (DTU) and the University of Copenhagen. The University of Oxford and the University of Copenhagen were among the first research institutions to offer degree programmes in SDS. In 2018, the University of Oxford launched the one-year MSc in Social Data Science, which was followed by the two-year master's programme at the University of Copenhagen in 2020. Since then, an increasing number of universities have begun to offer graduate programs or specializations in social data science

Social data science has emerged after the increasing availability of digitized social data, sometimes referred to as Big Data, and the ability to apply computational methods to this data at a low cost, which has offered novel opportunities to address questions about social phenomena and human behavior. While the origin of social data can be traced back to 1890s (when some 15 million individual records were processed by the US Census in the form of punch cards), the social data boom in the 21st century is a direct consequence of the increasing availability of consumer data resulting from the advent of e-commerce Subsequent waves of availability of unstructured social data include Amazon.com review system and Wikipedia, and more recently, social media, which has played a key role in the emergence of the digital attention economy and big tech.

== Criticism and debates ==
Data scientists have played a vital role in the data revolution, both during the original tech-optimist phase where big data and the Internet was seen as the solution to many societal and scientific problems, and as participants in the tech-lash that followed in its wake as result of, among other things, the Facebook–Cambridge Analytica data scandal. Social data science researchers and research projects have been especially impactful in debates and criticism revolving around:

- Surveillance capitalism
- Digital disinformation
- Algorithmic bias
- The replication and validity crisis on the social sciences
- Ethics and privacy
- Data governance

== Impact and examples ==
Social data science research is typically published in multidisciplinary journals, including top general journals Science, Nature, and PNAS, as well as notable specialized journals such as:

- Nature Human Behaviour
- Nature Computational Science
- The Journal of Computational Social Science
- Big Data and Society
- Science Advances
- Nature Communications
- Scientific Reports
- PLOS ONE

In addition, social data science research is published in the top social science field journals including American Sociological Review, Psychological Science, American Economic Review, Current Anthropology.

== Education and Research Institutions ==
There are multiple specific definitions of social data science, but several institutions around the world currently offer degree and research programs under the rubric of Social Data Science.

=== Education ===
- M.Sc. in Social Data Science - University of Copenhagen
- M.Sc. in Social Data Science and Policy - Amrita Vishwa Vidyapeetham
- MSc in Social Data Science - University of Oxford
- MSc in Social and Economic Data Science (SEDS) - University of Konstanz
- BSc in Social Data Science - University of Hong Kong
- M.S. in Social Data Science - Pohang University of Science and Technology
- P.Grad.Dip in Social Data Science - University of Dublin
- MSc Applied Social Data Science - The London School of Economics
- Master of Science in Social Data Science - Central European University
- MSc Social Data Science - University of Essex
- MSc in Techno-Anthropology - University of Aalborg
- MSc Social Data Science - University College Dublin
- BSc in Social Data Science - Witten/Herdecke University
- Quantitative Analysis and Social data Science (QASS) - KU Leuven
- Human and Social Data Science MSc - University of Sussex
- International Diploma in Data Science for the Social Sciences - Facultad Latinoamericana de Ciencias Sociales

=== Research ===
- Copenhagen Center for Social Data Science (SODAS) - University of Copenhagen
- Center for Social Data Science - University of Helsinki
- Social Data Science Lab - Cardiff University
- SoDa Laboratories - Monash University
- Mannheim Center for Data Science - University of Mannheim
- Social & Behavioral Data Science Centre (SoBe DSC) - University of Amsterdam
- Social Data Science - Alan Turing Institute
- Social Data Science Center - University of Maryland
- Centre for Social Data Analytics - Auckland University of Technology
- MASSHINE – Aalborg University

== Professions and industry ==
Social data scientists are in high demand across society, specifically for employers valuing interdisciplinary skills, and can be found working as:

- 1. Industry Researchers: Typical workplaces: governments, companies and corporations, independent research institutes, foundations, NGOs. Typical titles: researcher, data manager, data steward, data scientist, data engineer, consultant, manager, director, partner, politicians, data analyst, software developer, BI, UX, UI.Researcher
- 2. Academic Researchers: Ph.D. Students, Researchers, Postdocs, Professors
- 3. Entrepreneurs: Start your own business using social data science methods to solve real-world social problems. Typical titles: CTO, CEO, Chief Data Scientist

== Sub Branches ==
The field of social data science can be divided into a range of method-based sub-fields:

=== Method-based sub-fields ===
- Network Science: Network analysis is often utilized to visualize or study network dynamics in social data science studies. This includes for instance social media networks.
- Mixed Digital Methods: In computer-assisted qualitative analysis, the researcher often utilizes computational methods such as natural language processing techniques or topic modelling to explore a corpus of text, such as parliamentary speeches or Twitter data.
- Machine Learning for Causal Inference: The social sciences are often interested in finding causal relationships between variables. This is of special interest to social data science, where multiple fields of research try to establish appropriate policy responses to contemporary societal issues. Often, drawing from research from Judea Pearls directed acyclical graph approach and the Neymann-Rubin Causal model to inform whether there exists a causal relationship between two (or more) variables. Furthermore, incorporating machine learning into causal inference is of great interest.
- Natural Language Processing: Applied natural language processing is the adaptation and repurposing of methods from natural language processing and the application of these methods to questions of social behavior.

=== Themes ===
- Algorithmic Bias and Fairness: Considering how algorithms play a still larger role in humans everyday life, the study of fairness in this context has grown as a field. Especially whether miniorieties are negatively or positively impacted by these algorithms.
- Polarization and Misinformation: Many scholars use enormous amounts of granular data generated by social media and political agents to study social contagion, the spread of misinformation and disinformation. These studies often use text or social media interactions to explore how politicians and/or the public behave and interact in the digital and physical arena.
- Climate Social Data Science: The intersection between climate science, and digital (behavioral) data. This includes climate activism on social media and using digital trace data to investigate how people and societies are impacted by rising temperatures (CITE: Rising Temperature Erode Human Sleep Globally).
