= The International Journal of Biostatistics =

- Discipline: Biostatistics
- Language: English
- Edited by: Antoine Chambaz, Alan Hubbard, Mark van der Laan

Publication details
- History: 2005–present
- Publisher: Walter de Gruyter
- Frequency: Biannual
- Impact factor: 0.840 (2017)

Standard abbreviations
- ISO 4: Int. J. Biostat.

Indexing
- ISSN: 2194-573X (print); 1557-4679 (web)
- LCCN: 2014205292
- OCLC no.: 2194-573X

Links
- Journal homepage

The International Journal of Biostatistics is a biannual peer-reviewed scientific journal covering biostatistics. It was established in 2005 and is published by Walter de Gruyter. Its editors-in-chief are Antoine Chambaz (Université Paris Descartes), Alan Hubbard (University of California, Berkeley), and Mark van der Laan (University of California, Berkeley). According to the Journal Citation Reports, the journal has a 2017 impact factor of 0.840.
