= A Million Random Digits with 100,000 Normal Deviates =

1955 random number compilation

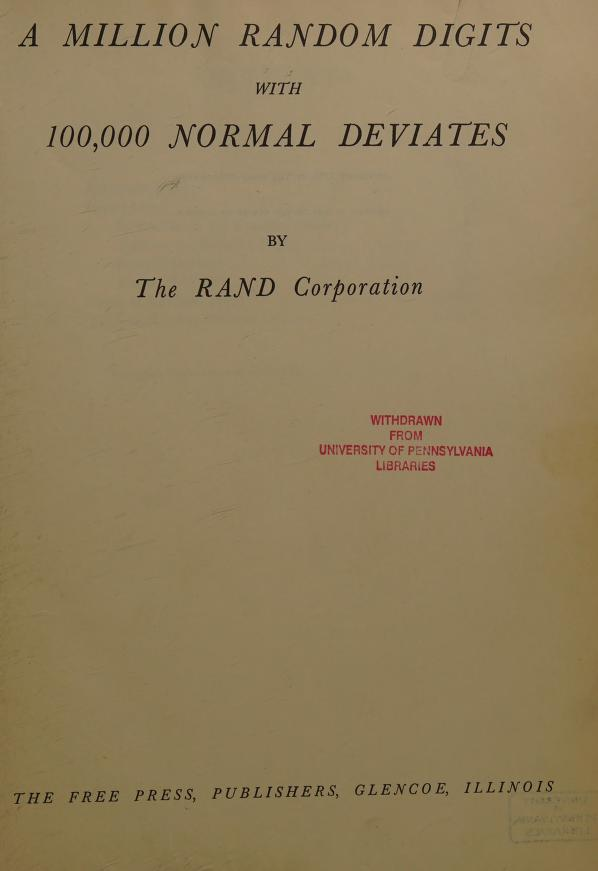
- Title page of the 1955 edition
- Author: RAND Corporation
- Language: English
- Genre: Data table
- Published: 1955
- Publisher: The Free Press
- ISBN: 9780833030474 (2001 ed.)
- Dewey Decimal: 513.2

A Million Random Digits with 100,000 Normal Deviates is a 1955 compilation of random numbers created by the RAND Corporation and published by the Free Press. Demand for large volumes of random digits had increased in the 1940s and 1950s, as Monte Carlo simulations (which require many random values) gained popularity in physics and applied mathematics. The RAND Corporation is a think tank and research center that was associated with the United States military during the Cold War. It was limited in its calculations by the size of the largest previously available compilation, a 1939 volume of 100,000 random digits.

To produce digits, the Douglas Aircraft Company partnered with RAND in 1947 to create a vacuum tube computer to be used as what RAND described as an "electronic roulette wheel". The fluctuations of electrical pulses through a circuit board were measured once a second and converted into binary data, which was later converted into decimal, then into data tables. After the initial run, the data was analyzed by statisticians and found to have some statistical biases; this was resolved by scrambling through modular arithmetic. The book was released to acclaim by mathematicians and statisticians, who noted its high degree of statistical randomness and detailed introduction, which explained the generation method and testing methods used. The 100,000 normal deviates (values distributed according to a normal distribution or bell curve) were generated using the first 500,000 digits.

A Million Random Digits gradually fell out of widespread use as more accessible random number generation became available through advancements in computing technology. A paperback edition was published in 2001. In 2020, a RAND software engineer discovered minor mistakes made in the compilation process, although the underlying randomness was not compromised.

== Background ==
While random numbers are useful for various purposes, including cryptography and academic research, it is extremely difficult to generate them without unintentional weighting. Physical methods such as throwing dice or drawing slips from a container have a small level of predictability. First used to simulate neutrons in the 1940s at the Los Alamos National Laboratory, Monte Carlo simulations are a form of calculation which rely on the use of a very large volume of random numbers. These calculations became popular in physics and applied mathematics during the mid-20th century, increasing the academic demand for sources of random numbers, especially following the growth of computing.

The British statistician L. H. C. Tippett noted a higher than average chance of drawing the same card from a bag, even when the bag was mixed between draws. He created a randomization procedure and published a list of 41,600 digits in 1927, entitled Tracts for Computers No. XV; however, statistician Udny Yule later critiqued these tables as "patchy". Two other British statisticians, Ronald Fisher and Frank Yates, created a table of 15,000 digits; when these were found to have a statistical excess of sixes, they randomly replaced 50 of these with other randomly selected digits. Prior to 1955, the largest publicly available table of random numbers was Random Sampling Numbers, a volume of 100,000 digits compiled by the statisticians Maurice Kendall and Bernard Babington Smith and published by Cambridge University Press in 1939; generated based on electrical fluctuations, these were the first set of machine-generated random digits published. The United States Interstate Commerce Commission had privately circulated a table of 105,000 random digits, while statistician Herman Wold had published a set of 25,000 normal deviates (numbers whose occurrence follows a normal distribution or "bell curve") to two decimal places.

The RAND Corporation emerged from the RAND Project, initially conceived in 1945 as a civilian research and development program for the United States military. In 1948, it incorporated as a think tank in Santa Monica, California, with sponsorship from the United States Air Force and the Ford Foundation. RAND hired scholars from a broad range of scientific fields, including mathematics and computer science, seeking to support the United States against the Soviet Union in the Cold War through technological advancements.

== Creation and methodology ==
During the 1940s and 1950s, RAND used electric accounting machines, mechanical calculators, and analog computers for its research, simulating phenomena such as orbits and missile trajectories. RAND began a program to generate a million random digits for its research and computing in 1947. Although Kendall and Smith's tables were large, the RAND Corporation would need to use them multiple times for its purposes, potentially creating unwanted correlations.

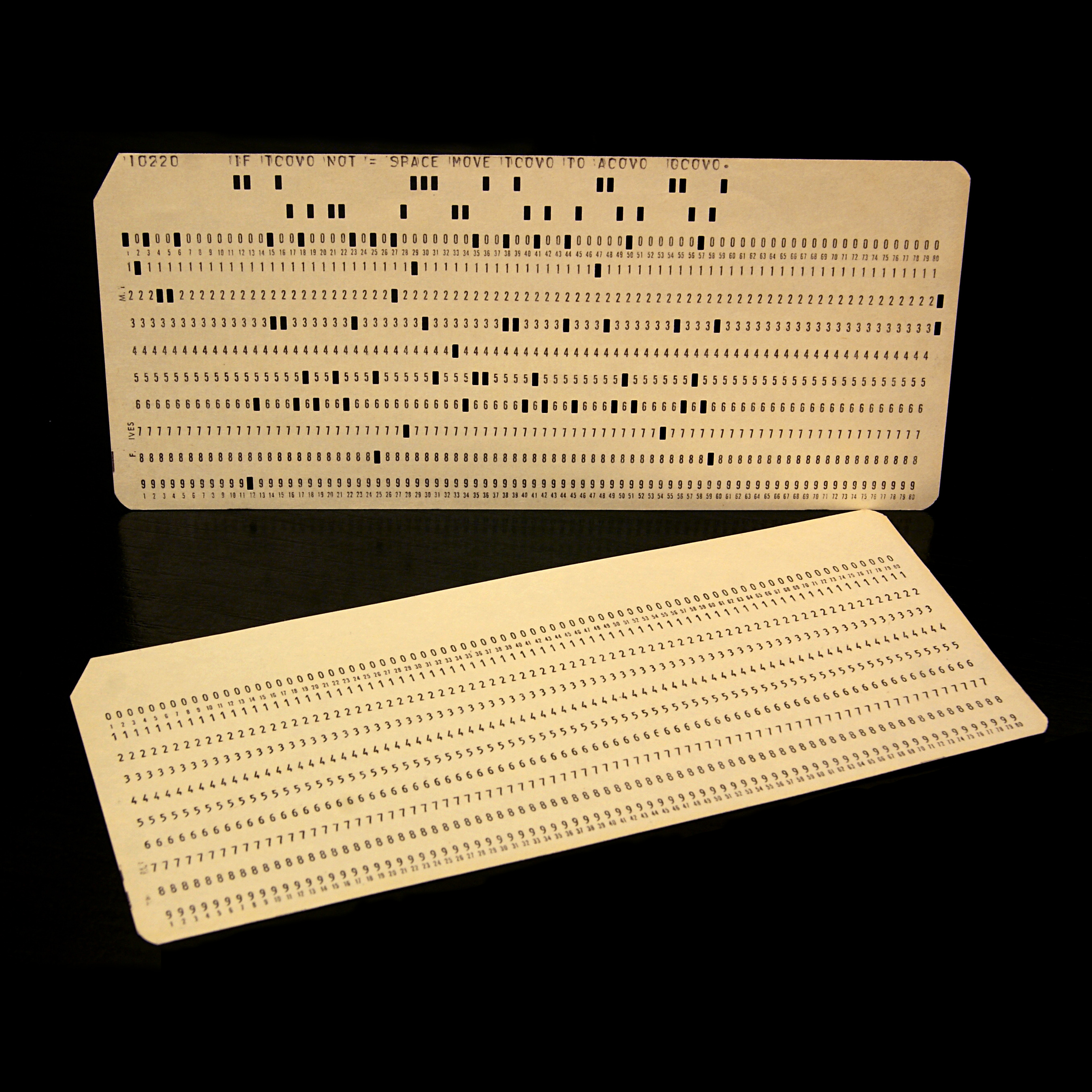
Data for the table was initially stored on punch cards.

To generate the digits, RAND used what it described as an "electronic roulette wheel", a vacuum tube computer assembled by the Douglas Aircraft Company and inspired by a concept proposed by RAND mathematician Cecil Hastings. It was engineered by two Douglas Flight Test Laboratory employees—Bill Gunning and Walter Frantz—and RAND employee Ernest Bower. The machine used a random frequency pulse, averaging 100,000 pulses per second, gated by a consistent pulse once per second. Circuitry passed these pulses through a five-digit binary counter, resulting in one number per second. Afterwards, these numbers were converted to decimal. Numbers above 20 were discarded, while any two-digit numbers had their first digit removed. These were then printed onto punch cards as strings of random digits, and converted into data tables by an IBM Cardatype, a data-processing computer. At least 20,000 punch cards were needed for the project. The exact number of digits printed on each card is unknown, as the cards were likely sold for scrap in 1949; they might have had 50, 72, or 80 digits.

The generation process is poorly documented. Production of the digits is recorded to have begun on April 29, 1947; as RAND had moved into new facilities in May, it is unknown whether the machine began producing the digits at the Douglas Aircraft laboratory, or if it was only tested before its eventual move to the RAND headquarters. The first 500,000 digits were finished on May 21, while the full million were reached on July 7. At one point in the generation process, the machine began to create an anomalous ratio of odd to even digits; after the machine was allowed to cool and restarted, this bias disappeared.

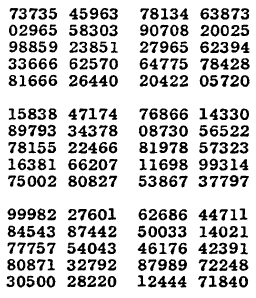
A set of the book's random digits from lines 10580–10594, columns 21–40

RAND mathematicians such as Bernice Brown performed tests on the digits, with results published in 1948 and 1949. Some statistical biases were noticed in the digits' distribution, leading to additional processing work done by statistician George Brown to remove bias from the original set of tables. This entailed additional scrambling pairs of digits through modular arithmetic. Alongside the million digits, RAND generated 100,000 normal deviates. These deviates are generated to three decimal places, using data from the first 500,000 of the random digits.

RAND subjected the final set of one million digits to a number of tests, the results of which were included with the published edition. These include a frequency test of digits, "poker tests" of five digit groups, and serial tests of successive groups of two and four digits. The editors noted that "it did not seem necessary to proofread every page of the final manuscript", but wrote that they proofread every twentieth page. Statistician Carl Kossack described this process as humorous, noting that "random" mistakes in printing could have inadvertently added correlations.

=== Publication history ===
The first 21,875 digits of RAND's compilation were published in the Journal of the American Statistical Association over a series of nine issues, from December 1952 to December 1954. All digits and deviates were compiled in the book A Million Random Digits with 100,000 Normal Deviates, published by the Free Press of Glencoe, Illinois, in 1955.

The book was created with photographic offset printing, using the tables created by the IBM Cardatype. Each page of random digits contains fifty lines, each consisting of a serial number and ten groups of five digits, for a total of 2,500 digits per page. The pages for deviates also contain fifty lines, each with a serial number and ten deviates. It credits fourteen contributors, including the engineers, programmers, and mathematicians. The book contains a twenty-five page introduction with no signed author, containing explanations for the generation and testing processes of the digits, as well as instructions on how to generate sets of numbers of arbitrary sizes using the digits. These instructions recommended users to flip the book open to a random page and blindly select a random set of five digits. Noting the tendency for readers to open similar pages repeatedly and to select numbers closer to the center of the page, the editors recommended placing a mark at the spot to avoid accidental reuse.

A Million Random Digits was sold for US$10 (equivalent to $120.19 in 2025), and by 1962 was also available for purchase as a set of punch cards. According to RAND data, the book sold 7,000 copies over its first 15 years of publication, which included three printings. Due to continued popularity, the book was republished as a paperback in 2001, featuring a new foreword. After RAND listed this edition for online purchase on Amazon, it received hundreds of spurious and comedic reviews describing it as if it were a literary work.

== Reception ==
The magazine Newsweek published a review of the book on March 14, 1955, stating "It was bound to happen sooner or later—an electronic computer has written a fine big book". The seemingly oxymoronic name "normal deviates" was said to be confusing to non-mathematicians; a common anecdote claimed that the book was initially filed in the New York Public Library under psychology.

Mathematician John Hammersley praised the book as useful, noting that prior tables were too small for many Monte Carlo simulations, but criticized that the serial numbers for each set of random digits were not offset or separated from the rest of the text. He claimed that this could lead to them being mistaken for randomized digits by users. Several mathematicians praised the book for the quality and clarity of its printing. Kossack called it a "very fine technical job", noting that the need for large amounts of verifiably random digits was common across scientific fields. The mathematician John Tukey also praised the volume, writing that it had been very thoroughly inspected. He ran his own tests on the mean squares of normal deviants, which found an individual deviate of 0.9967, closely agreeing with the theoretical 1.00000. As the book cautions against the re-use of the numbers due to the potential of statistical correlations, Tukey suspected that mathematicians would be overly cautious with this. He wrote that adding a pseudorandom sequence of numbers to each digit could be used to create additional random values.

=== Legacy ===
In addition to physicists and statisticians, A Million Random Digits saw wide use among engineers, pollsters, market analysts, and lottery administrators. A common rumor within RAND purported that a submarine commander had used the book to create unpredictable evasion courses. Due to advances in computing technology, books of random digits are no longer in much use. Modern methods include measuring the fluctuations of electricity running through a circuit (electronic noise) or the radioactive decay of atomic nuclei; however, bias may emerge in both of these systems by the means used to measure them. According to a 2008 RAND publication, use of the tables remained common in agricultural research.

The poet Jackson Mac Low used A Million Random Digits as a source of randomness within the production of his works. For his Stein series, a compilation of rewrites of the poet Gertrude Stein, Mac Low randomly selected a "seed" passage from a larger Stein work using A Million Random Digits. After this, he went through each letter in the seed passage sequentially, selecting words from the base text which shared a letter in the same position within the word. Art historian Joshua Shannon, writing in 2014, described A Million Random Digit's advice to obtain numbers by flipping to a random page in the book as unintentional comedy, contrasting this rudimentary method of selection with the highly technical manner the digits were produced.

In 2020, RAND software engineer Gary Briggs obtained raw data from the random number generation and simulated its processing. He discovered minor inaccuracies between the input and expected output. Within the book's 8th bloc of 50,000 digits, the count of twos and zeroes were off by one from the expected output, as well as an instance of "94" and "41" sequences replaced by "44" and "91". The book also contained 48 runs of four identical digits in a row, while there would statistically be around 40. Briggs noted that the randomness of the book's numbers was not compromised, but that some errors must have occurred during its compilation.
