= Statistics and Its Interface =

- Discipline: Statistics
- Language: English
- Edited by: Heping Zhang

Publication details
- History: 2008–present
- Publisher: International Press
- Frequency: Quarterly
- Open access: No
- Impact factor: 2.933 (2014)

Standard abbreviations
- ISO 4: Stat. Its Interface
- MathSciNet: Stat. Interface

Indexing
- ISSN: 1938-7989 (print); 1938-7997 (web)
- LCCN: 2007214432
- OCLC no.: 145562621

Links
- Journal homepage; Online access; Online archive

Statistics and Its Interface is a quarterly peer-reviewed open access scientific journal covering the interface between the field of statistics and other disciplines. The journal was established in 2008 and is published by International Press. The editor-in-chief is Heping Zhang (Yale University). The journal is abstracted and indexed in MathSciNet, Science Citation Index Expanded, and Zentralblatt MATH. According to the Journal Citation Reports, the journal has a 2014 impact factor of 2.933 - the second highest among all statistical journals that publish original articles.
