= The Journal of Risk Model Validation =

Journal of Risk Model Validation
- Discipline: Finance
- Language: English
- Edited by: Steve Satchell

Publication details
- History: 2007–present
- Publisher: Infopro Digital Services
- Frequency: Bimonthly
- Impact factor: 0.4 (2023)

Standard abbreviations
- ISO 4: J. Risk Model Valid.

Indexing
- ISSN: 1753-9579 (print); 1753-9587 (web)

Links
- Journal homepage

The Journal of Risk Model Validation is a bimonthly peer-reviewed academic journal focusing on the implementation and validation of risk models. It was established in 2007 and is published by Infopro Digital Services. The editor-in-chief is Stephen Satchell, (Cambridge University). According to the Journal Citation Reports, the journal has a 2023 impact factor of 0.4.
