= AStA Wirtschafts- und Sozialstatistisches Archiv =

- Discipline: Statistical analysis
- Language: English, German
- Edited by: Timo Schmid, Markus Zwick

Publication details
- History: 2007–present
- Publisher: Springer Science+Business Media on behalf of the German Statistical Society (Germany)
- Frequency: Quarterly

Standard abbreviations
- ISO 4: AStA Wirtsch. Sozialstat. Arch.

Indexing
- ISSN: 1863-8155 (print); 1863-8163 (web)

Links
- Journal homepage; Online archive

AStA Wirtschafts- und Sozialstatistisches Archiv (English: AStA Economical and Social Statistics Archive) is a quarterly peer-reviewed scientific journal of statistics published quarterly by Springer Science+Business Media. It was established in 2007 and covers statistical analysis. Articles are in German or English. The journal evolved from the Allgemeines Statistisches Archiv, established in 1890.

== Abstracting and indexing ==
The journal is abstracted and indexed in:

- Scopus
- Academic OneFile
- Expanded Academic
- Research Papers in Economics
