= Statistical Methods in Medical Research =

- Discipline: Statistics
- Language: English
- Edited by: Brian Everitt

Publication details
- History: 1992-present
- Publisher: SAGE Publications
- Frequency: Bi-monthly
- Impact factor: 2.388 (2018)

Standard abbreviations
- ISO 4: Stat. Methods Med. Res.

Indexing
- CODEN: SMMRFQ
- ISSN: 0962-2802 (print); 1477-0334 (web)
- LCCN: 92640657
- OCLC no.: 574365485

Links
- Journal homepage; Online access; Online archive

Statistical Methods in Medical Research is a peer-reviewed academic journal that publishes papers in the fields of Health Care and Medical Informatics. The journal's editor is Brian Everitt (King's College London). It has been in publication since 1992 and is currently published by SAGE Publications.

== Scope ==
Statistical Methods in Medical Research is a scholarly journal which publishes articles in the main areas of medical statistics and it is also used as a reference for medical statisticians. The journal focuses solely on statistics and medicine and aims to keep professionals up to date with all statistical techniques.

== Abstracting and indexing ==
Statistical Methods in Medical Research is abstracted and indexed in, among other databases: SCOPUS, and the Social Sciences Citation Index. According to the Journal Citation Reports, its 2013 impact factor is 2.957, ranking it 14 out of 85 journals in the category ‘Health Care Sciences & Services’., 5 out of 119 journals in the category ‘Statistics & Probability’., 6 out of 52 journals in the category ‘Mathematical & Computational Biology’. and 3 out of 25 journals in the category ‘Medical Informatics’.
