= Communications in Statistics =

Communications in Statistics is a peer-reviewed scientific journal that publishes papers related to statistics. It is published by Taylor & Francis in three series, Theory and Methods, Simulation and Computation, and Case Studies, Data Analysis and Applications.

== Communications in Statistics – Theory and Methods ==
Communications in Statistics - Theory and Methods
- Discipline: Statistics
- Language: English

Publication details
- History: 1970–present
- Publisher: Taylor & Francis
- Frequency: 24/year
- Open access: Open Select
- Impact factor: 0.612 (2019)

Standard abbreviations
- ISO 4: Commun. Stat. - Theory Methods
- MathSciNet: Comm. Statist. Theory Methods

Indexing
- ISSN: 0361-0926 (print); 1532-415X (web)
- OCLC no.: 48483352

Links
- Journal homepage

This series started publishing in 1970 and publishes papers related to statistical theory and methods. It publishes 20 issues each year. Based on Web of Science, the five most cited papers in the journal are:

- Kulldorff M. A spatial scan statistic, 1997, 982 cites.
- Holland PW, Welsch RE. Robust regression using iteratively reweighted least-squares, 1977, 526 cites.
- Sugiura N. Further analysts of the data by Akaike's information criterion and the finite corrections, 1978, 490 cites.
- Hosmer DW, Lemeshow S. Goodness of fit tests for the multiple logistic regression model, 1980, 401 cites.
- Iman RL, Conover WJ. Small sample sensitivity analysis techniques for computer models. with an application to risk assessment, 1980, 312 cites.

=== Abstracting and indexing ===
Communications in Statistics – Theory and Methods is indexed in the following services:

- Current Index to Statistics
- Science Citation Index Expanded
- Zentralblatt MATH

== Communications in Statistics – Simulation and Computation ==
Communications in Statistics - Simulation and Computation
- Discipline: Statistics
- Language: English

Publication details
- History: 1972–present
- Publisher: Taylor & Francis
- Frequency: Monthly
- Open access: Open Select
- Impact factor: 0.651 (2019)

Standard abbreviations
- ISO 4: Commun. Stat. - Simul. Comput.
- MathSciNet: Comm. Statist. Simulation Comput.

Indexing
- ISSN: 0361-0918 (print); 1532-4141 (web)
- OCLC no.: 48483321

Links
- Journal homepage

This series started publishing in 1972 and publishes papers related to computational statistics. It publishes 6 issues each year. Based on Web of Science, the five most cited papers in the journal are:

- Iman RL, Conover WJ. A distribution-free approach to inducing rank correlation among input variables, 1982, 519 cites.
- Wolfinger R. Covariance structure selection in general mixed models, 1993, 248 cites.
- Helland IS, On the structure of partial least squares regression, 1988, 246 cites.
- McCulloch JH. Simple consistent estimators of stable distribution parameters, 1986, 191 cites.
- Sullivan Pepe M, Anderson GL. A cautionary note on inference for marginal regression models with longitudinal data and general correlated response data, 1994, 162 cites.

=== Abstracting and indexing ===
Communications in Statistics – Simulation and Computation is indexed in the following services:

- Current Index to Statistics
- Science Citation Index Expanded
- Zentralblatt MATH

== Communications in Statistics: Case Studies, Data Analysis and Applications ==
Communications in Statistics: Case Studies, Data Analysis and Applications
- Discipline: Statistics
- Language: English

Publication details
- History: 2015–present
- Publisher: Taylor & Francis
- Frequency: Quarterly
- Open access: Open Select

Standard abbreviations
- ISO 4: Commun. Stat.: Case Stud. Data Anal. Appl.

Indexing
- ISSN: 2373-7484

Links
- Journal homepage; Journal homepage

This series started publishing in 2015 and publishes case studies and associated data analytic methods in statistics. It publishes 4 online-only issues a year. Based on CrossRef, the three most cited papers in the journal are:

- Vandna Jowaheer, Yuvraj Sunecher & Naushad Mamode Khan. A non-stationary BINAR(1) process with negative binomial innovations for modeling the number of goals in the first and second half: The case of Arsenal Football Club, 2016, 2 cites.
- Nikolay Kulmatitskiy, Lan Ma Nygren, Kjell Nygren, Jeffrey S. Simonoff & Jing Cao, Survival of Broadway shows: An empirical investigation of recent trends, 2015, 2 cites.
- Hui Quan, Xuezhou Mao, Yujun Wu, Meehyung Cho, Peng-Liang Zhao, Ji Zhang & Deborah Bauer, Adaptive design and timeline prediction for cardiovascular event trials for a non-inferiority/superiority claim, 2015, 1 cite.
