= Cancer Informatics =

- Discipline: Oncology, computational biology
- Language: English
- Edited by: J.T. Efird

Publication details
- History: 2005–present
- Publisher: SAGE Publications
- Open access: Yes

Standard abbreviations
- ISO 4: Cancer Inform.

Indexing
- ISSN: 1176-9351
- OCLC no.: 61659304

Links
- Journal homepage; Online access

Cancer Informatics is a peer-reviewed open access medical journal focusing on the application of computational biology to cancer research. It was established in 2005 and was originally published by Libertas Academica. SAGE Publications became the publisher in September 2016. The editor in chief is J. T. Efird.

== Abstracting and indexing ==
The journal is abstracted and indexed in:

- Chemical Abstracts Service
- EMBASE
- PubMed Central
- Scopus
