= Yongge Wang =

Computer science professor

Yongge Wang (born 1967) is a computer science professor at the University of North Carolina at Charlotte specialized in algorithmic complexity and cryptography. He is the inventor of IEEE P1363 cryptographic standards SRP5 and WANG-KE and has contributed to the mathematical theory of algorithmic randomness. He co-authored a paper demonstrating that a recursively enumerable real number is an algorithmically random sequence if and only if it is a Chaitin's constant for some encoding of programs. He also showed the separation of Schnorr randomness from recursive randomness. He also invented a distance based statistical testing technique to improve NIST SP800-22 testing in randomness tests. In cryptographic research, he is known for the invention of the quantum resistant random linear code based encryption scheme RLCE.
