= Journal of Statistical Software =

- Discipline: Statistics
- Language: English
- Edited by: Bettina Grün, Torsten Hothorn, Rebecca Killick, Nathalie Vialaneix, Achim Zeileis

Publication details
- History: 1996–present
- Publisher: Foundation for Open Access Statistics (United States)
- Open access: Yes
- License: Creative Commons Attribution License; GNU GPL or other GPL compatible license (for code)
- Impact factor: 6.992 (2021)

Standard abbreviations
- ISO 4: J. Stat. Softw.

Indexing
- ISSN: 1548-7660
- OCLC no.: 42456366

Links
- Journal homepage

The Journal of Statistical Software is a peer-reviewed open-access scientific journal that publishes papers related to statistical software. The Journal of Statistical Software was founded in 1996 by Jan de Leeuw of the Department of Statistics at the University of California, Los Angeles. Its current editors-in-chief are Bettina Grün, Torsten Hothorn, Rebecca Killick, Nathalie Vialaneix, Achim Zeileis. It is published by the Foundation for Open Access Statistics. The journal charges no author fees or subscription fees.

The journal publishes peer-reviewed articles about statistical software, together with the source code. It also publishes reviews of statistical software and books (by invitation only). Articles are licensed under the Creative Commons Attribution License, while the source codes distributed with articles are licensed under the GNU General Public License.

Articles are often about free statistical software and coverage includes packages for the R programming language.

== Abstracting and indexing ==
The Journal of Statistical Software is indexed in the Current Index to Statistics and the Science Citation Index Expanded. Its 2018 Impact Factor in Journal Citation Reports is 11.655. The journal was named a Rising Star by Science Watch in 2011.
