= Statistical Modelling =

- Discipline: Statistical modelling
- Language: English
- Edited by: Vicente Núñez-Antón, Andreas Mayr and Francesco Bartolucci

Publication details
- History: 2007-present
- Publisher: SAGE Publications on behalf of the Statistical Modelling Society
- Frequency: Bimonthly
- Impact factor: 1.2 (2023)

Standard abbreviations
- ISO 4: Stat. Model.

Indexing
- CODEN: SMTOCF
- ISSN: 1471-082X (print); 1477-0342 (web)
- LCCN: 2007205323
- OCLC no.: 437689790

Links
- Journal homepage; Online access; Online archive; Journal page at society's website

Statistical Modelling is a bimonthly peer-reviewed scientific journal covering statistical modelling. It is published by SAGE Publications on behalf of the Statistical Modelling Society. The editors-in-chief are Vicente Núñez-Antón (University of the Basque Country UPV/EHU), Andreas Mayr (University of Marburg), and Francesco Bartolucci (University of Perugia).

== Abstracting and indexing ==
The journal is abstracted and indexed in:

- Science Citation Index Expanded
- Scopus
- ProQuest databases
- EBSCO Information Services|EBSCO databases

According to the Journal Citation Reports, the journal has a 2014 impact factor of 0.977.
