= L. H. C. Tippett =

British statistician

- Born: 8 May 1902; London, England
- Died: 9 November 1985 (aged 83); St Austell, England
- Occupation: statistician
- Known for: inventing the random number table, extreme value theory, Fisher–Tippett–Gnedenko theorem, Fisher–Tippett distribution

Leonard Henry Caleb Tippett (8 May 1902 – 9 November 1985), known professionally as L. H. C. Tippett, was an English statistician.

Tippett was born in London but spent most of his early life in Cornwall and attended St Austell County Grammar School, where his contemporaries included the historian A. L. Rowse. Tippett graduated in physics in the early 1920s from Imperial College London. He studied for his Master of Science in statistics under Karl Pearson at the Galton Laboratory, University College London and R. A. Fisher at Rothamsted. He spent his entire career, 1925 to 1965, on the staff of the Shirley Institute, Manchester becoming in 1952 one of the first assistant directors. Along with R.A. Fisher and Emil Gumbel, he pioneered extreme value theory. The Fisher–Tippett distribution is named after him.

At the Shirley Institute he applied statistics to the problem of yarn breakage rates in weaving. In the late 1920s and 1930s, he became known for his 'snap-reading' method of observation which led to improved production efficiency and operative utilization. As a result of his work in the textile industry, he was awarded the Shewart Medal of the American Society for Quality Control.

Tippett published "Random Sampling Numbers" in 1927 and thus invented the random number table.

In 1965 he retired to St Austell, Cornwall and in this period became an UNIDO consultant, being active in India. He died in 1985 after being hit by a van whilst walking from his home to the St. Austell Choral Society to sing in the St. Matthew Passion.

== Awards ==
- Warner Medal of the Textile Institute
- Fellow of the American Statistical Association, 1950
- Guy Medal in Silver of the Royal Statistical Society, 1954
- Honorary MSc UMIST
- President of the Manchester Statistical Society
- President of the Royal Statistical Society, 1965
- Shewart Medal of the American Society for Quality Control

== Books ==
- Random Sampling Numbers, CUP, London, 1927
- Statistics, The Home University Library of Modern Knowledge, Oxford University Press, London, 1943
- Methods of Statistics, Williams & Norgate Ltd., London, 1931, 1948, 1952
- Statistical Methods for Textile Technologists, by T. Murphy, K. P. Norris, L. H. C. Tippett, Textile Institute, Manchester, 1960, 1963, 1973, 1979
- A Portrait of the Lancashire Textile Industry, OUP, London 1969

Professional and academic associations
Preceded by M. S. Bartlett	President of the Manchester Statistical Society; 1960–62	Succeeded by H. E. Wadsworth
