= Statistics and Computing =

- Discipline: Mathematics, Statistics, Computer science
- Language: English
- Edited by: Ajay Jasra

Publication details
- History: 1991–present
- Publisher: Springer Science+Business Media
- Impact factor: 1.6 (2024)

Standard abbreviations
- ISO 4: Stat. Comput.

Indexing
- ISSN: 0960-3174 (print); 1573-1375 (web)

Links
- Journal homepage

Statistics and Computing is a peer-reviewed academic journal that deals with statistics and computing. It was established in 1991 and is published by Springer.

In 2026, 18 associate editors of the journal stated that they planned on resigning to protest the new mandatory $2,990 article processing charge instated by Springer Nature.
