= AEV 3 Kodiak =

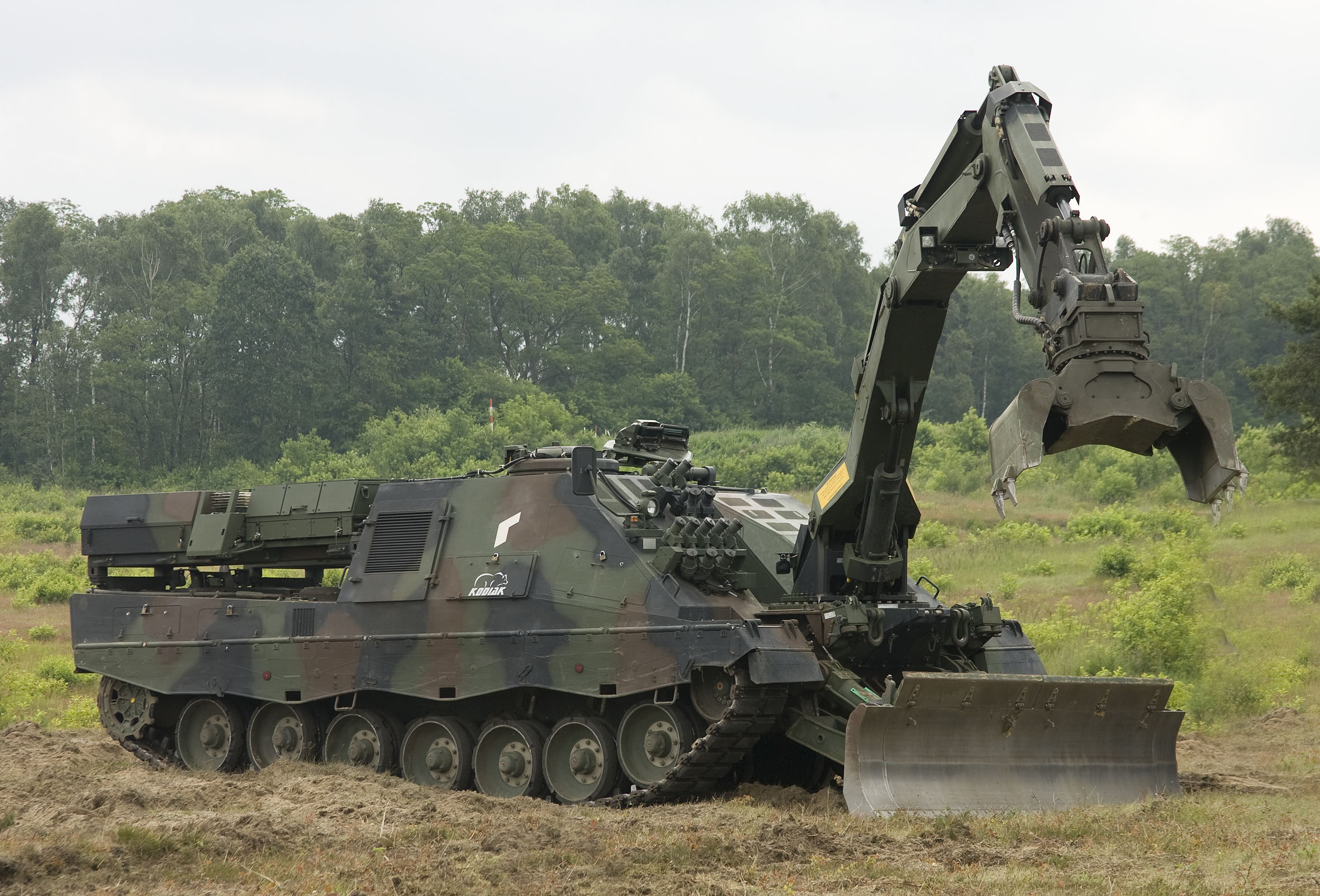
- The AEV 3 Kodiak is a Leopard 2 main battle tank (MBT) based armoured engineering vehicle that can be used for a wide variety of battlefield and support roles
- Type: Armoured engineering variant of a main battle tank
- Place of origin: Germany; Switzerland

Service history
- In service: 2009–present
- Used by: See Users
- Wars: War in Afghanistan

Production history
- Designer: Rheinmetall Landsysteme GmbH and RUAG Defence; Krauss-Maffei Wegmann are technical design parent of the base platform
- Designed: from 2002
- Manufacturer: Rheinmetall (local assembly/conversion is an option if not new-build)
- Unit cost: Leopard 2A6 base platform: US$5.74 million (2007)
- Produced: 2007–present
- No. built: 42 (plus 44 on order 2021)

Specifications
- Mass: Military Load Classification (MLC) 70
- Length: 10.2 metres (400 inches)
- Width: 3.54 m (139 in) (transport width)
- Height: 2.6 m (100 in) (without machine gun)
- Crew: 2 or 3
- Armour: welded steel, with a package of spaced multilayer passive composite armour
- Main armament: a RCWS (Remote Controlled Weapon Station) with options ranging from 5.56 mm light machine gun to 40 mm grenade launcher can be fitted at the commander's hatch
- Engine: MTU 873 Ka-501 liquid-cooled V12 twin-turbo diesel engine 1,500 PS (1,479 hp, 1,103 kW) at 2,600 rpm
- Power/weight: 21.4 PS/t (15.7 kW/t) (approx. based on MLC 70 classification)
- Transmission: Renk HSWL 354 automatic with 4 forward and 2 reverse gears
- Suspension: Torsion bar suspension
- Fuel capacity: 1,100 litres (242 imperial gallons; 291 US gallons) in interconnected tanks
- Operational range: 500 km on roads (estimated)
- Maximum speed: 68 km/h (42 mph) forward; 31 km/h (19 mph) reverse

The AEV 3 Kodiak is a Leopard 2 main battle tank (MBT) based armoured engineering vehicle that can be used for a wide variety of battlefield engineering, infrastructure and support roles. These roles can include, but would not be limited to, minefield breaching, route denial, dozing and digging tasks, and the erection or demolition of obstacles. The vehicle was originally developed for a Swiss Army requirement by the consortium of Rheinmetall Landsysteme GmbH (Germany) and RUAG Defence (Switzerland).

English nomenclature for the vehicle is now AEV 3 Kodiak, while German is Pionierpanzer 3 (PiPz 3) Kodiak. Depending on user or reference source the AEV 3 Kodiak may also be referred to as Gepanzerte Pioniermaschine Kodiak, AEBV (Armoured Engineering and Breaching Vehicle), Armoured Engineer Vehicle 3 Kodiak, Ingenjörbandvagn 120, or the L2-AEV.

== Development ==
Development of the AEV 3 Kodiak traces back to 2002 and the Swiss Army's Armoured Engineer Vehicle 3 requirement. As a technology partner of the Swiss Army, RUAG Defence entered into a consortium with Rheinmetall Landsysteme, Rheinmetall (with Krauss-Maffei Wegmann) joint-manufacturers of the Leopard 2 main battle tank (MBT) on which the AEV 3 Kodiak is based. The name Kodiak was adopted for the Armoured Engineer Vehicle 3 during development for future marketing purposes only.

The first Armoured Engineer Vehicle 3 prototype for the Swiss Army was constructed using company funds and was based on a surplus Swiss Army Leopard 2 MBT, the Leopard 2 designated Panzer 87 by the Swiss. In the summer of 2003 the prototype underwent two months of trials with the Swiss Army, and during 2004 it was shown at the Eurosatory defence exhibition in Paris. Following this showing the prototype underwent a series of trials with Leopard 2 MBT users Denmark, the Netherlands, Spain and Sweden. The Swedish trials involved leasing the prototype to the Swedish armed forces procurement agency (FMV, Försvarets materielverk) for winter trials. Following these trials results were shared with the International AEV Coordination Group which had been established to develop some commonality within armoured engineering vehicle requirements and programs. At this juncture the group consisted of Denmark, the Netherlands, Spain, Sweden Switzerland. Spain and Denmark would ultimately leave the group.

On 9 January 2007, Rheinmetall announced a Swiss Army contract award for 12 Armoured Engineer Vehicle 3 valued at CHF 95 million (US$76 million). The twelve Leopard 2 chassis used came from Swiss Army stocks with turrets removed and construction occurred in Switzerland. By late 2011 the last example had been delivered and the vehicles are used by the Swiss Army's Panzersappeurbataillon 11.

The next customers for AEV 3 Kodiak would be the Netherlands and Sweden in a joint purchase. Since 2001 and to reduce costs Sweden had attempted collaborations with Switzerland and Denmark without success and in 2005 would commence lone procurement of an armoured engineering vehicle. The Netherlands joined the Swedish project in 2006. On 16 January 2008, Sweden and the Netherlands placed a joint order for 16 vehicles, six for Sweden and ten for the Netherlands. Contract value was around €40 million (Sweden) and €60 million (the Netherlands). Delivery occurred between 2011 and 2012.

Swedish vehicles are known as AEV 3 S (Swedish), or locally as the Ingenjörbandvagn 120, and are based on six Swedish Army Leopard 2 chassis (Stridsvagn 121 in Swedish service) chassis. The chassis were upgraded locally to Stridsvagn 122 standard and then transported to Germany for conversion. The Netherlands vehicles are based on Leopard 2A4 chassis. These were overhauled locally before being converted in Germany. In service the Dutch vehicles replaced fourteen Leopard 1 engineering vehicles. Swedish and Dutch vehicles reportedly share 95% commonality with differences limited to camouflage patterns, smoke grenade launchers, and some tools/equipment. The Dutch vehicles do feature a bomblet protection package.

Singapore has a total of fourteen AEV 3 Kodiaks (known locally as L2-AEV), these ordered and delivered in between 2014 and 2015. In service these are operated by the 38th Battalion, Singapore Combat Engineers (38 SCE), and replaced the US-built M728 CEV.

The most recent user announced for the AEV 3 Kodiak is the German Bundeswehr. On 12 May 2021 Rheinmetall announced that the Federal Office for Bundeswehr Equipment, Information Technology and In-Service Support (BAAINBw) had signed a contract for the manufacture and delivery of a 44 Kodiak, with a gross value of around €295 million. The first example will be produced in 2023, with deliveries to be complete by 2029. The order includes a number of additional support- and training-related services.

== Description ==
The AEV 3 Kodiak typically uses surplus Leopard 2 hulls from existing users, but is available as a new-build vehicle on a current-generation Leopard 2 hull. Generic modifications include the removal of the turret and installation of a completely new fixed superstructure, the installation of a hydraulic mounting for a dozer blade or mine clearing plough, and the installation of a telescopic arm typically fitted with an excavator bucket.

Hull structure and layout

The fixed superstructure of the AEV 3 Kodiak is constructed from all-welded steel, the protection level of which is classified, and for which a mine-protection package has been developed. The superstructure features a split air-conditioned crew compartment on the front left and front right of the vehicle. The left compartment is for the driver and an engineer crewman, the right compartment for the commander. The driver has a single-piece rear opening hatch with three integral day periscopes. A camera system with up to six cameras (on the main boom, dozer blade and the front and rear of the vehicle) provide the two- or three-person crew with a panoramic view provides individual situational awareness for the crew. If required, the vehicle can be line-of-sight remotely controlled.

Located centrally between the crew compartment at the front of the vehicle is the excavator arm. When not in use this is traversed to the rear and locates between the crew compartment. The excavator arm broadly resembles that of a conventional backhoe loader, but with two pivot points instead of one. The standard excavator bucket has a volume of one cubic meter and, when in continuous use, can move up to 200 cubic meters of earth per hour. The arm has a maximum horizontal reach of 9 meters and a reach of 8.2 meters vertically. The bucket and other tools can be removed/attached from under armour via a quick-coupling device. A range of other tools are available and these include a gripper, a hydraulic hammer, an earth auger, or a fascine launching system. On a rack above the rear engine deck two of these tools may be transported if required. The excavator arm may also be used for lifting items such as logs or fascines, and has a maximum lift capacity of 3.5-tonnes; 2.6-tonnes with the bucket attached.

Also mounted at the front of the vehicle is a hydraulically operated tiltable blade, this 3.42 m wide, or 4.02 m with extensions. This can be used for dozing or scraping operations, or to stabilise the vehicle when the winches are being used or the excavator arm is being used for heavy lifting. The blade can also be fitted with two scarifiers for route denial use. As an option, the blade can be removed and replaced with a mine-breaching package that can include a mine plough, a cleared lane marking system and a signature duplicator system to neutralise anti-tank mines fitted with advanced fuzes.

Primarily for obstacle removal, two Rotzler hydraulic nine-tonne variable speed winches are fitted. These have 200 m of usable cable and can operate singularly or together at up to 90 m/minute, and are typically utilised to remove obstacles. The Kodiak can also provide electrical or hydraulic power for external equipment such as work lights and hand tools.

For self-defence, a manually or remotely operated weapon station can be fitted to the AEV 3 Kodiak. Armament options range from a 5.56 mm light machine gun to a 40 mm grenade launcher. Swedish vehicles are fitted with the Kongsberg Protector Nordic ROWS, armed with a 12.7 mm M2 heavy machine gun and includes the Kongsberg VIS 95 day camera with a 95° field of view and the 850 nm Kongsberg Infrared Aim Laser. Smoke grenade launchers are also fitted. The AEV 3 Kodiak is fitted with fire detection, suppression and extinguishing systems.

Automotives

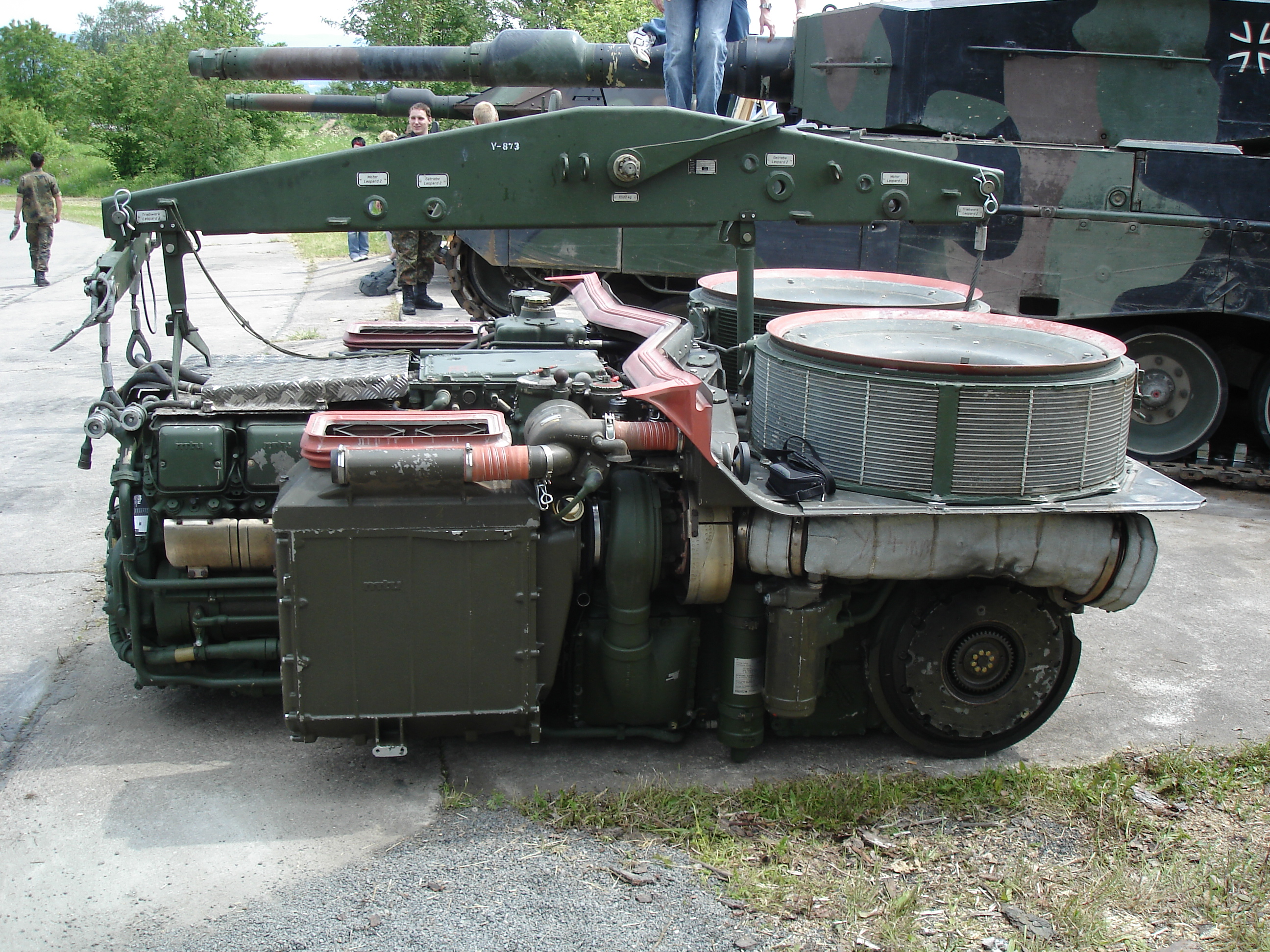
The AEV 3 Kodiak shares a common powerplant (the MTU 873 Ka-501) with the Leopard 2 MBT.

In common with the Leopard 2 MBT, the AEV 3 Kodiak is powered by a powerpack assembly consisting of an MTU 873 Ka-501 V-12 diesel coupled to a Renk HSWL 354 transmission. The rear-mounted powerpack weighs 2.59-tonnes (dry) and is designed engine first with transmission to the rear, engine air intakes being above the transmission. In situ the powerpack is divided in two by a waterproof bulkhead, this keeping the front of the assembly dry while the rear floods for cooling when deep fording; the AEV 3 Kodiak can ford to 2.25 m. The complete pack weighs 3,025 kg and can be changed in the field in approximately 35 minutes as a single unit.

The 47.6-litre MTU 873 Ka-501 develops 1,500 PS (1,479 hp, 1,103 kW) at 2,600 rpm1,500 hp and has a fuel consumption of around 3-litres/km on road and 5-litres/km when operating cross-country. Diesel fuel is stored in internally mounted fuel tanks with a combined capacity of 1,100 litres. Storage is arranged in interconnected tanks, the central 280 and 250 litre tanks being used for refuelling the vehicle. The Renk HSWL 354 transmission provides four forward and two reverse gears. Maximum road speed of the Kodiak is 68 km/h, 31 km/h in reverse. Maximum range on roads is around 500 km.

Electrical power is provided to the vehicle by a 20 kW generator mounted to the bottom of the powerpack and powered mechanically from the main drive. The system runs at between 24 V and 28 V with a capacity of up to 400 Ah, divided into a low power circuit of 100 Ah and a high power circuit of 300 Ah. For extreme power usage systems such as engine starting both circuits can be connected. When the engine is not running power is supplied from eight batteries, mounted on each side of the hull at the rear in dedicated compartments that can be accessed from the rear deck. Two 12 V batteries in series provide power to the low power circuit, with four 12 V batteries in three series sets of two each provide power to the high power circuit. Slave starting using a second vehicle in the event of battery failure can be achieved using a connector in the rear of the hull. An auxiliary power unit can supply 4.2 kW of electricity if required.

Running gear consists of seven dual rubber-tyred road wheels and four rubber-tyred track return rollers on each side, with idler front and drive sprocket to the rear. Road wheel suspension is provided by torsion bar and dampers. The 82-link steel tracks are 635 mm wide Diehl 570F and for additional traction, up to 18 of the rubber road pads on each track can be replaced with steel grousers. Vehicle braking is provided by a retarder and two oil cooled disc brakes.

Mobility parameters include the ability to climb a gradient of at least 60%, and to traverse a side slope of at least 30%. A vertical step of 920 mm can be surmounted, and a ditch of 3 m width can be crossed.

== Users ==
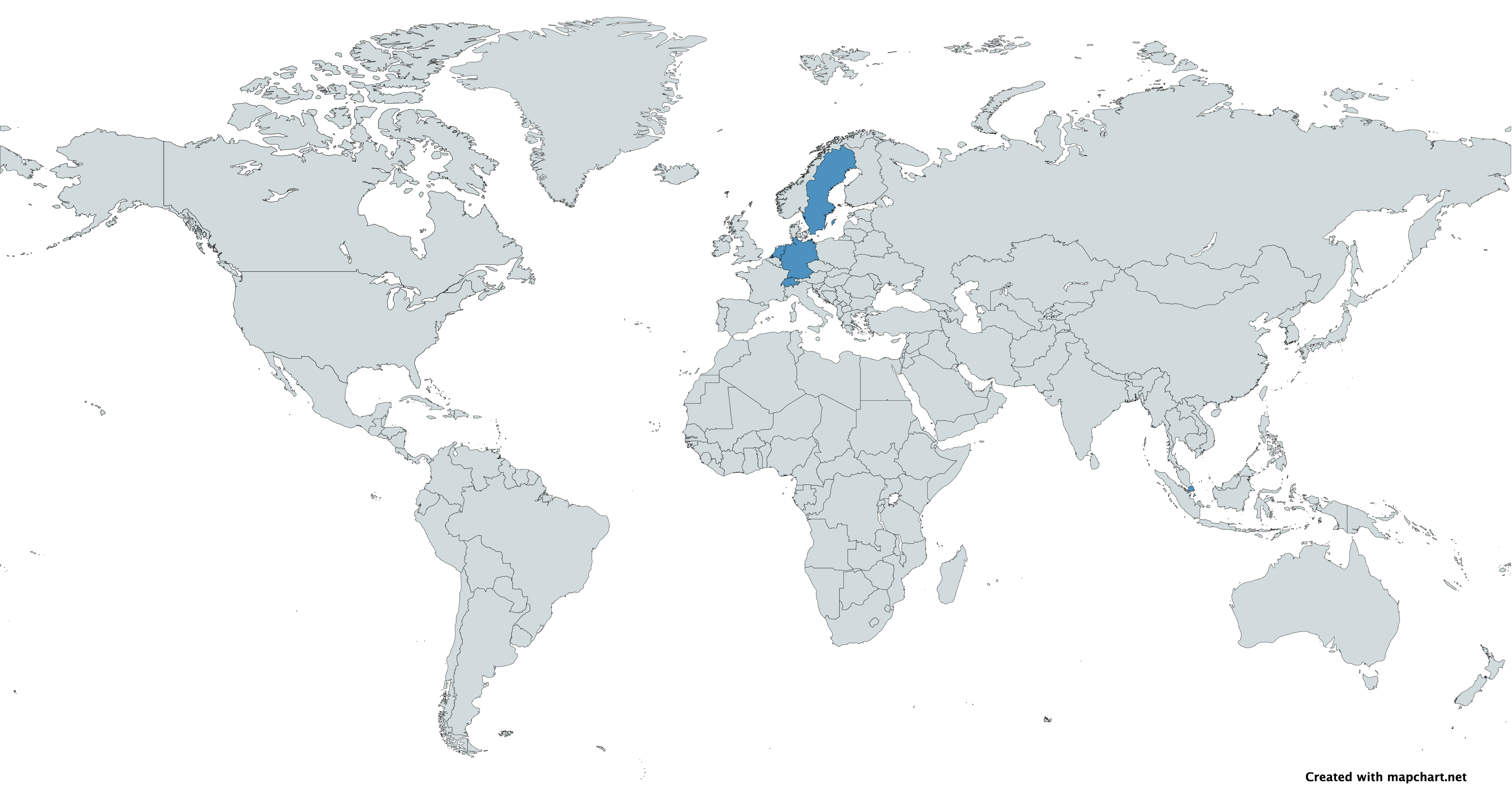
A map with AEV 3 Kodiak users in blue

- Germany – The AEV 3 Kodiak was Rheinmetall's offer to the German Army in a program to replace its Leopard 1 based Pionierpanzer 2 Dachs armoured engineer vehicle. In April 2021 the decision to procure 44 AEV 3 Kodiak was announced, this confirmed by Rheinmetall on 12 May 2021.
- Netherlands – The Netherlands joined the Swedish program for an armoured engineering vehicle in 2006 and in January 2008 a contract valued at around €60 million was placed for ten AEV 3 Kodiak with delivery occurring between 2011 and 2012. Swedish and Dutch vehicles reportedly share 95% commonality.
- Singapore – Singapore ordered a total of fourteen AEV 3 Kodiak (known locally as L2-AEV) for delivery between 2014 and 2015. In service these are operated by the 38th Battalion, Singapore Combat Engineers (38 SCE).
- Switzerland – The Swiss Army were the launch customer for the AEV 3 Kodiak, the vehicle designed initially for the Swiss requirement. The order for 12 examples was placed on 9 January 2007, this valued at CHF 95 million (US$76 million). By late 2011 the last example had been delivered and the vehicles are used by the Swiss Army's Panzersappeurbataillon 11.
- Sweden – Sweden formally launched the requirement that would procure six AEV 3 S (S – Swedish) with the local designation of Ingenjörbandvagn 120 in 2005. In January 2008 a contract valued at around €40 million was placed with delivery occurring between 2011 and 2012. Sweden's purchase was joint with the Netherlands.

Other operators of the Leopard 2 MBT that operate older armoured engineering vehicles (or in some cases no current vehicle of this type) include Austria, Chile, Greece, Indonesia, Poland, Portugal, and Turkey. With logistic, support and various other cost-saving commonalities factored in, these are considered by Rheinmetall to be possible future users for the AEV 3 Kodiak.

== Gallery ==
AEV 3 Kodiak

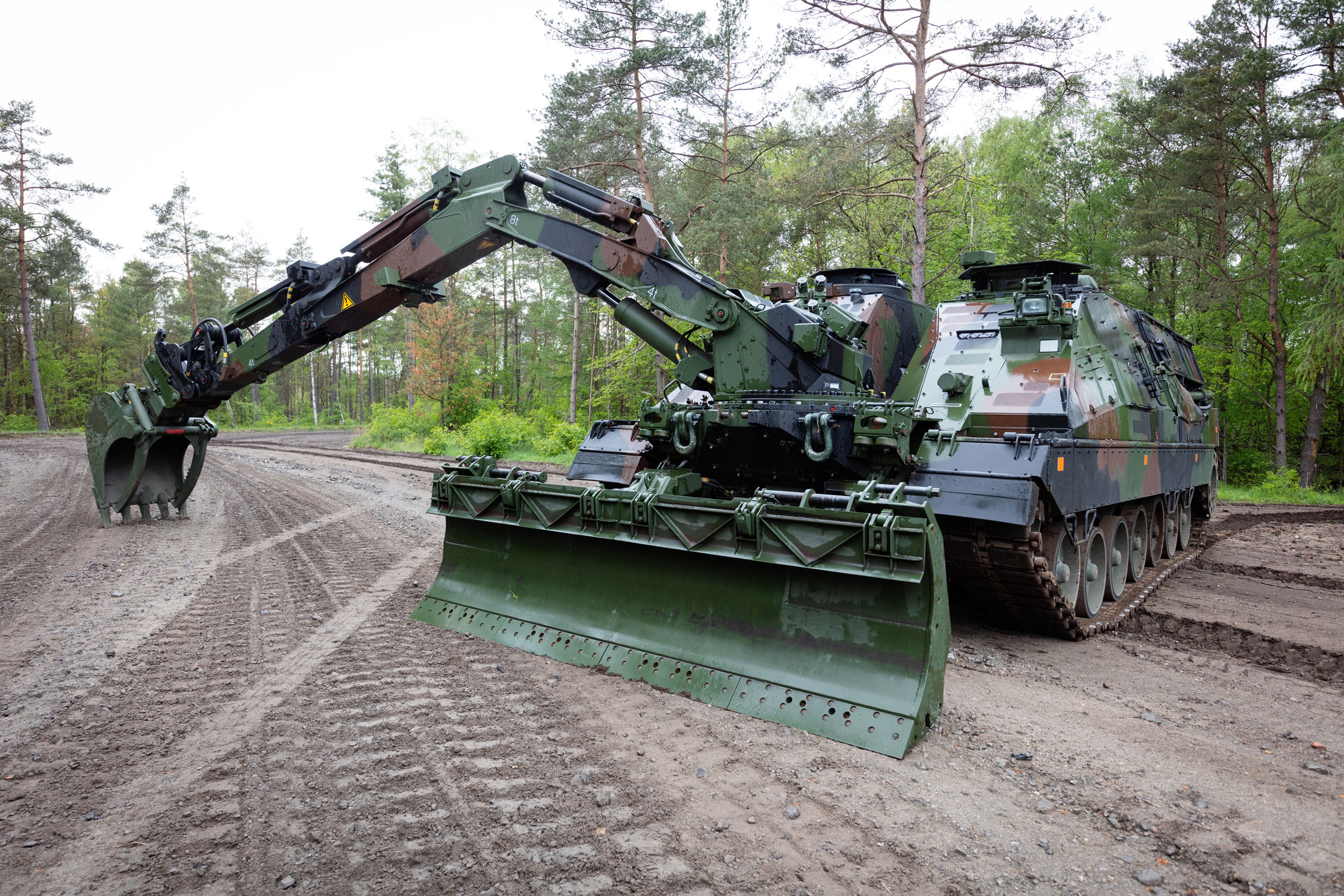
Rheinmetall promotional image of the AEV 3 Kodiak.

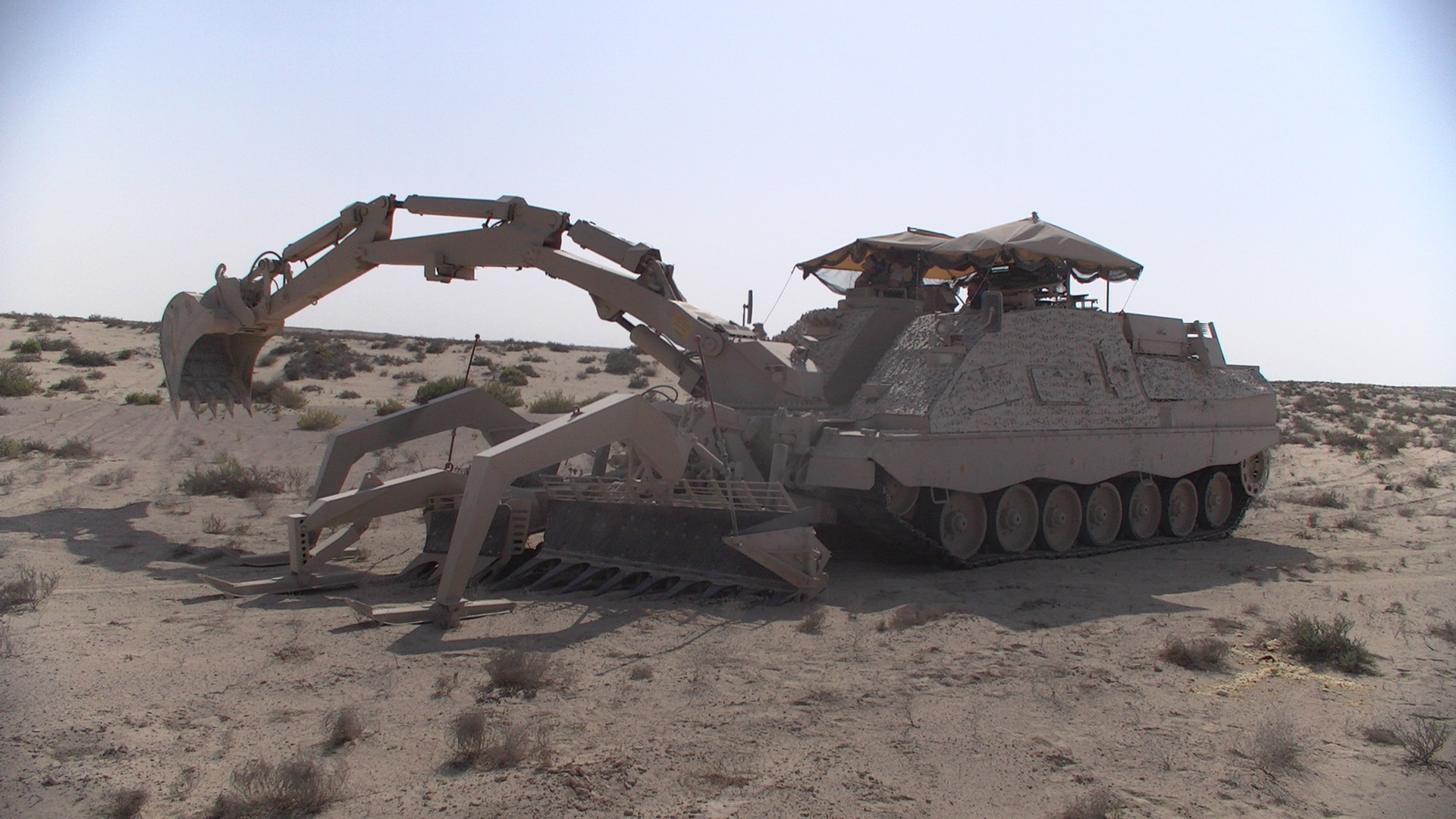
This hot climate optimised AEV 3 Kodiak is fitted with a Pearson Full Width Mine Plough.

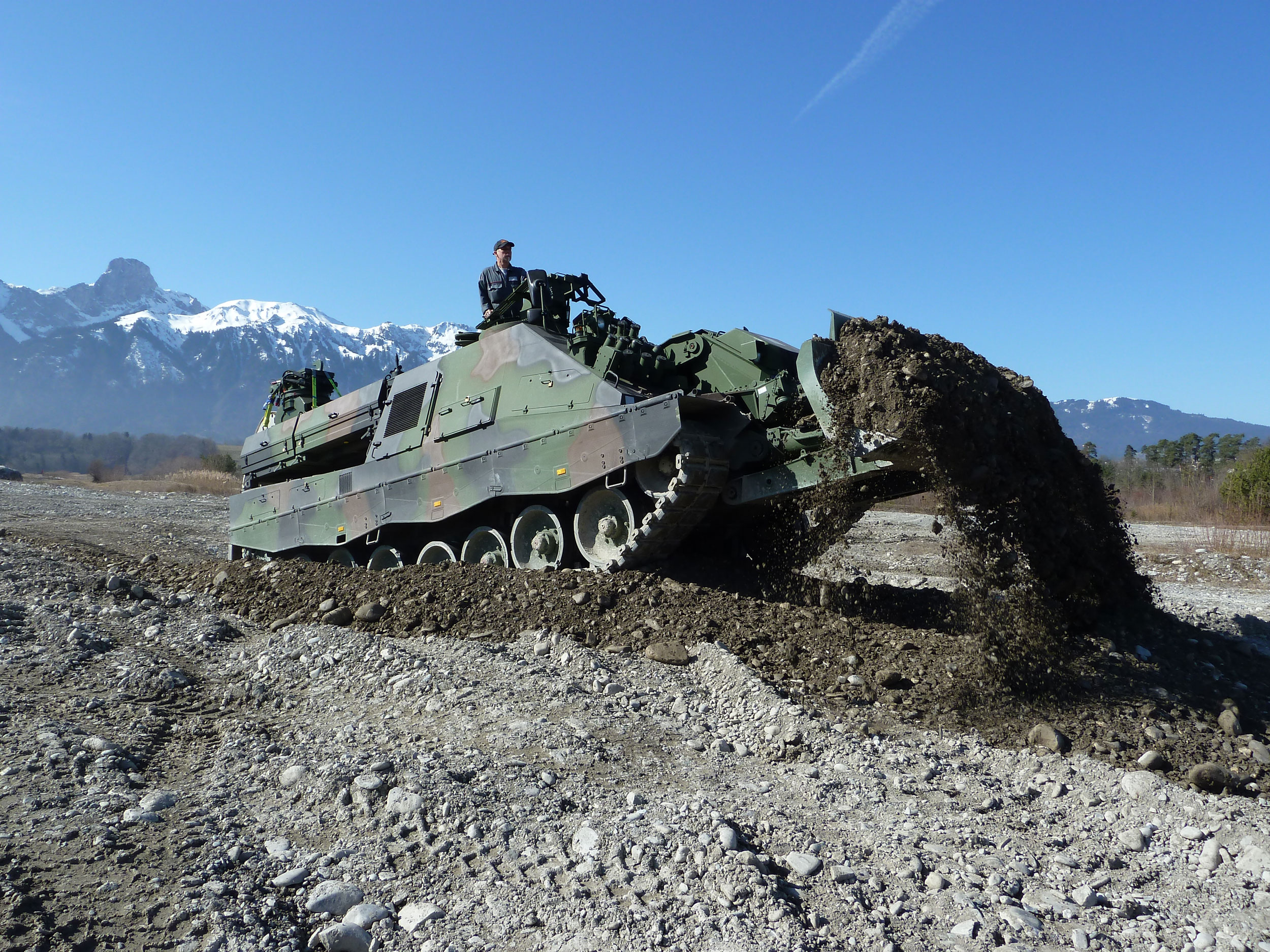
This AEV 3 Kodiak is using its front-mounted blade for dozing.

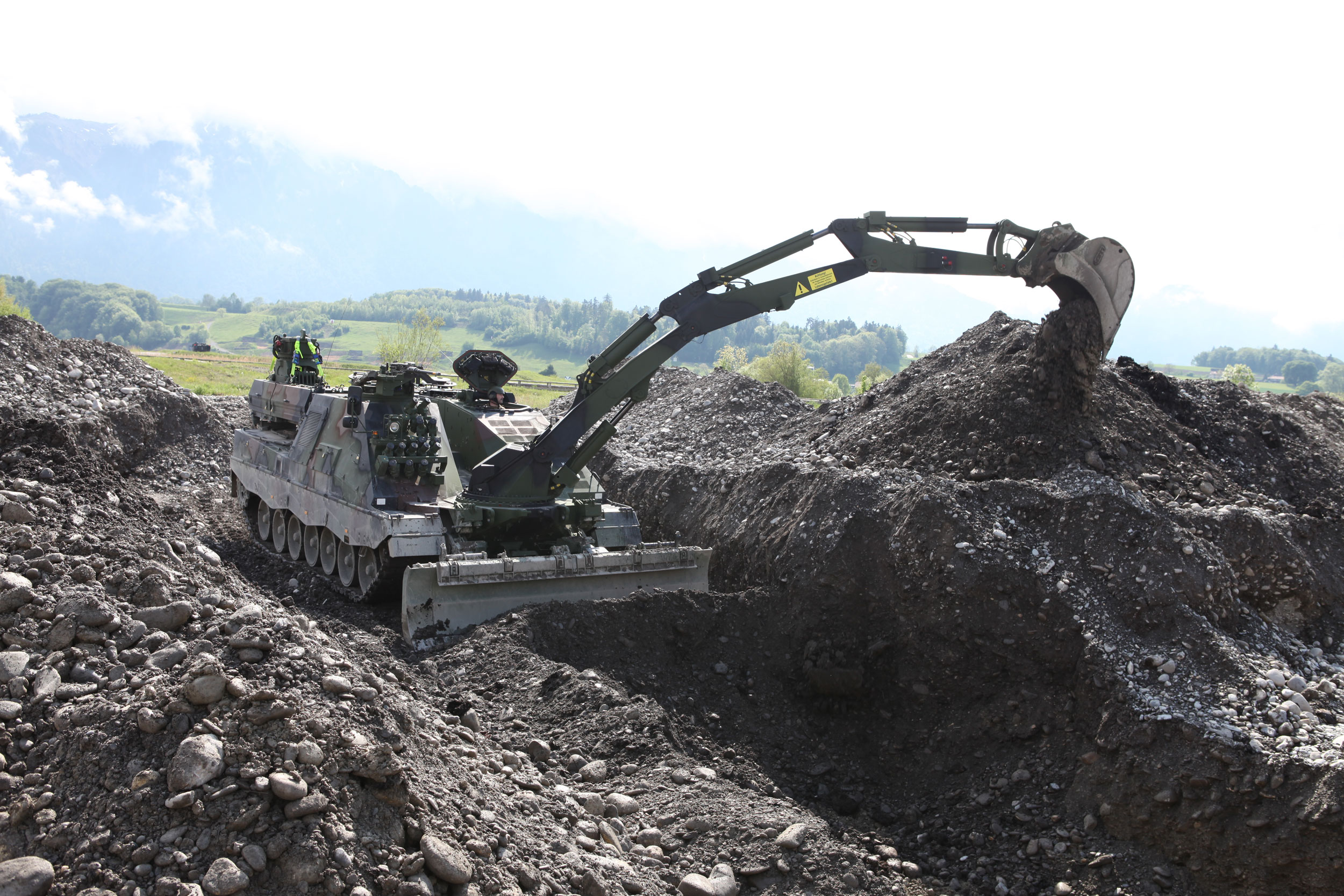
The two pivot points on the excavator arm of this AEV 3 Kodiak are clearly visible as it digs.

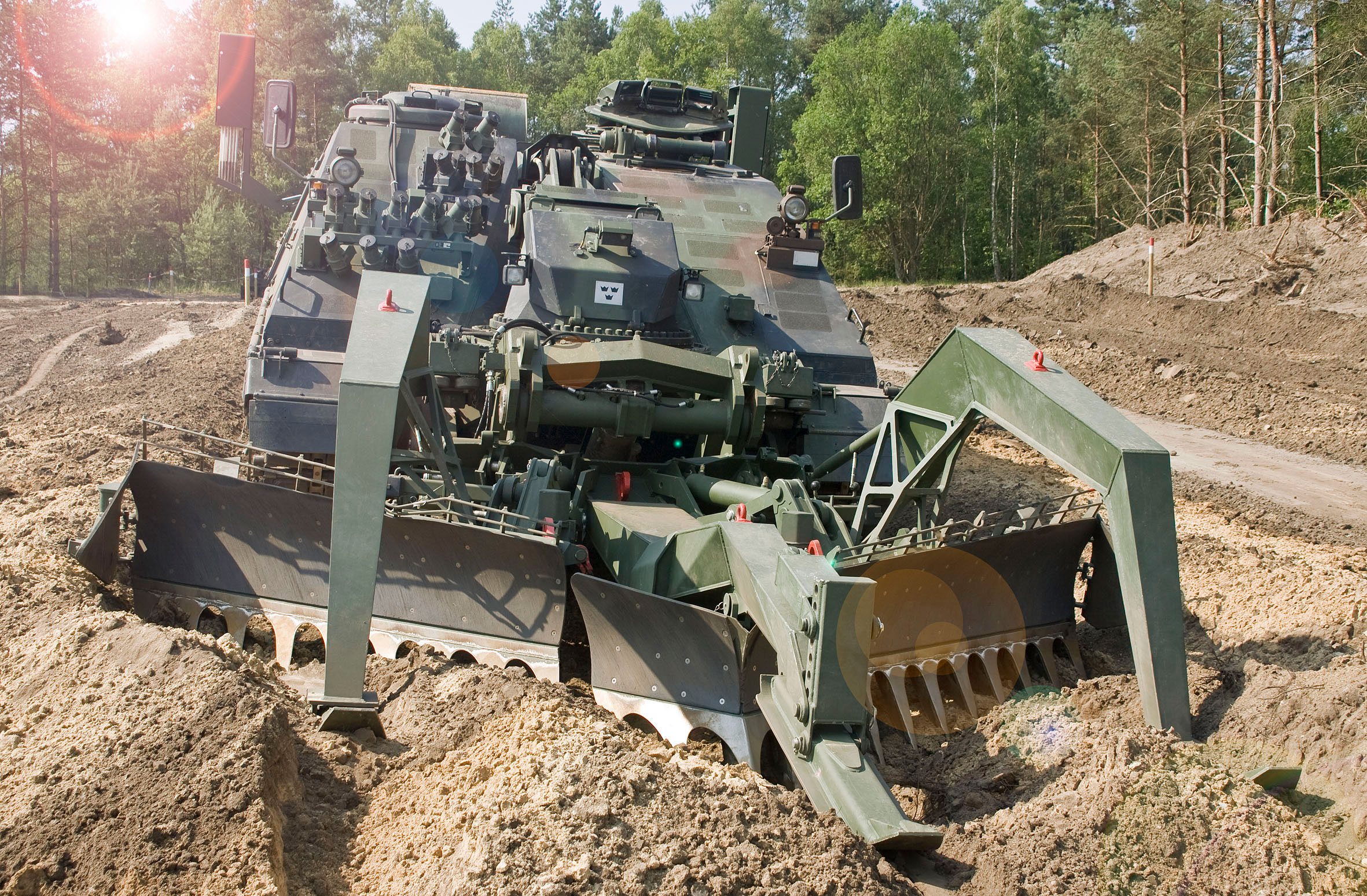
Front view of an AEV 3 Kodiak clearly showing installation of a mine plough.

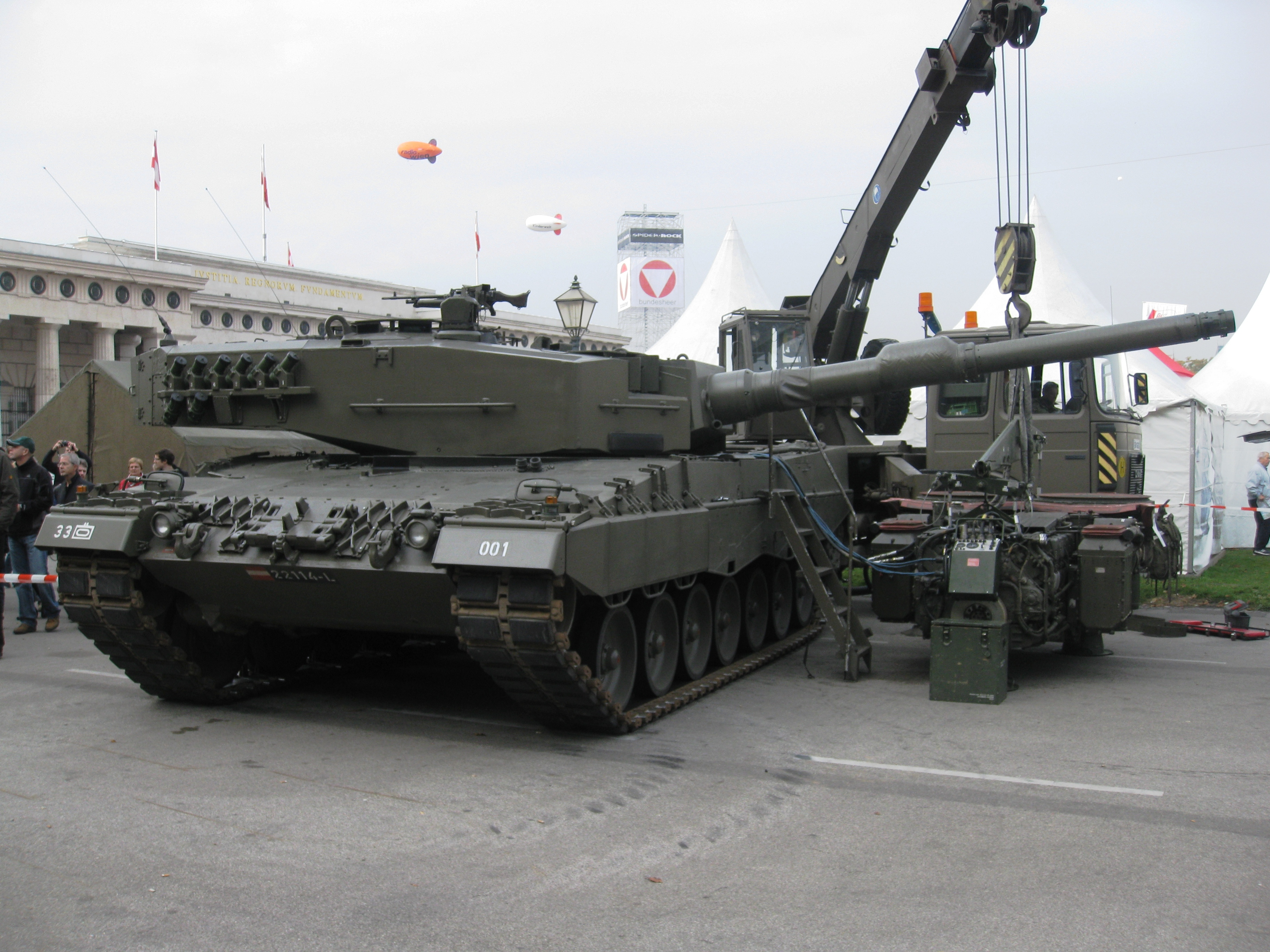
The AEV3 Kodiak is based on the Leopard 2 main battle tank.

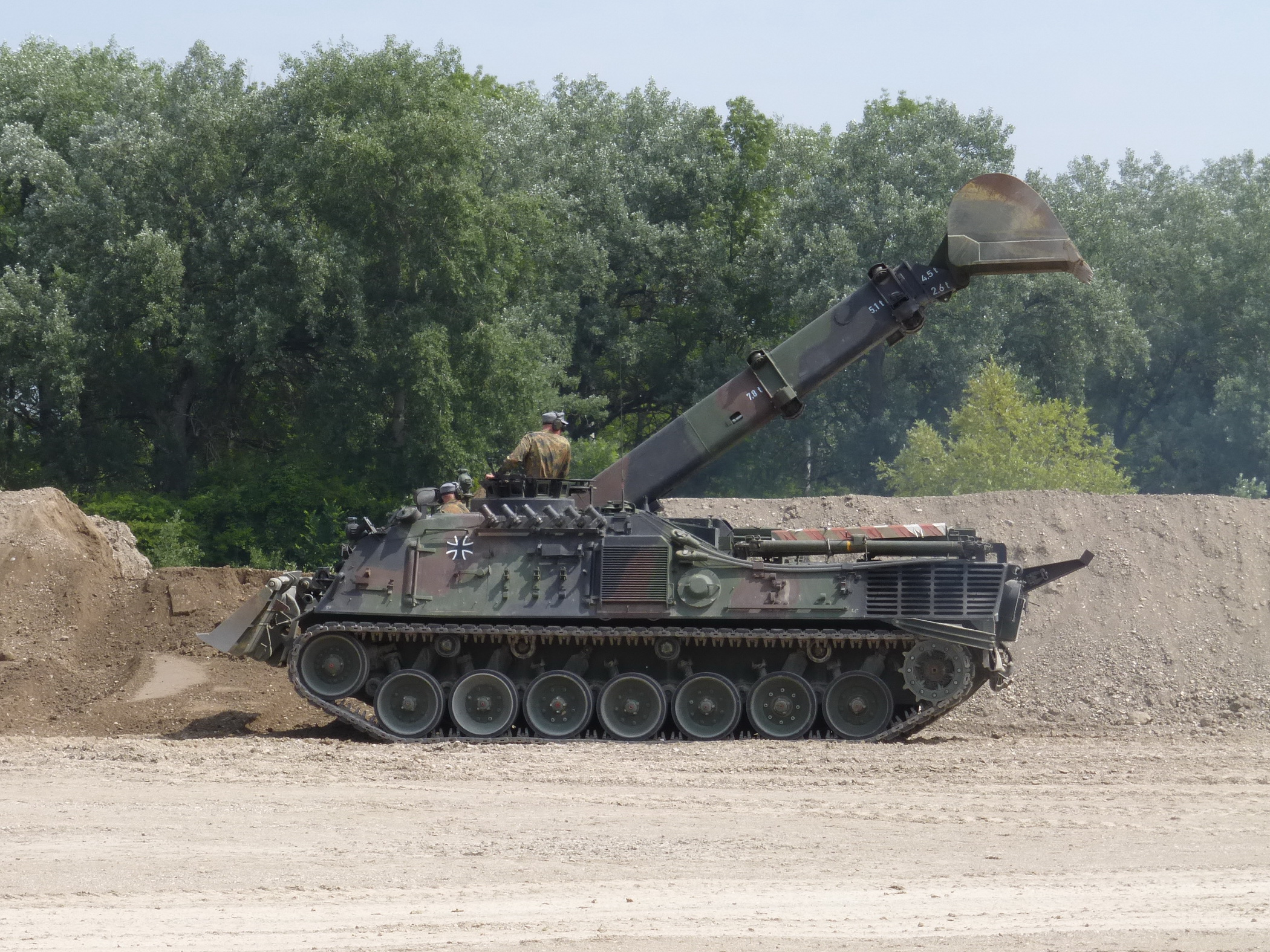
The AEV 3 Kodiak will likely complement and eventually replace Germany's Leopard 1 based Pionierpanzer 2 (Dachs).
