= MASOC =

The initialism MASOC can refer to:

== Military Uses ==
- Maritime Air Support Operations Center
- Mobile Air Support Operations Center

== Psychiatric Uses ==
- Massachusetts Adolescent Sexual Offender Coalition

== Religious Uses ==
- Muslim American Society of Orange County, California
- Malankara Archdiocese of the Syriac Orthodox Church
