= Kiviat =

Kiviat is a surname. Notable people with the surname include:

- Abel Kiviat, American middle-distance runner
- Robert Kiviat, television writer and producer specializing in paranormal phenomenon

== Other ==
- Kiviat diagram: a radar chart, graphical method of displaying multivariate data
