= Dianne Cook (statistician) =

Australian statistician

- Born: Dianne Helen Cook; Wauchope, New South Wales
- Education: University of New England (BSc, DipEd); Rutgers University (MSc, PhD)
- Occupations: Professor of econometrics & business statistics
- Known for: GGobi
- Scientific career
- Fields: Statistical graphics Data science Multivariate data
- Workplaces: Iowa State University (1993–2015); Monash University (2015–present)
- Thesis: Grand Tour and Projection Pursuit (1993)
- Doctoral advisor: Andreas Buja; Javier Cabrera
- Doctoral students: Hadley Wickham, Yihui Xie
- Website: www.dicook.org

Dianne Helen Cook is an Australian statistician, the former editor of the Journal of Computational and Graphical Statistics, and an expert on the visualization of high-dimensional data. She is Professor of Business Analytics in the Department of Econometrics and Business Statistics at Monash University and professor emeritus of statistics at Iowa State University. The emeritus status was chosen so that she could continue to supervise graduate students at Iowa State after moving to Australia.

== Education and early life ==
Dianne Helen Cook grew up in Wauchope, New South Wales as an athletic farm girl, the first woman to play on her local (men's) cricket team. She studied statistics at University of New England (Australia), where she earned a BSc and Dip.Ed. in 1982. She received her MS in 1990 and her PhD in 1993 from Rutgers University; her dissertation, supervised jointly by Andreas Buja and Javier Cabrera, was Grand Tour and Projection Pursuit.

== Career and research ==
Cook joined the Iowa State University faculty in 1993, and remained there until her move to Monash University in 2015. At Iowa State, her students have included Hadley Wickham and Yihui Xie.

She is one of the developers of GGobi, and with Deborah F. Swayne, she is the author of Interactive and Dynamic Graphics for Data Analysis: With R and GGobi (Springer, 2007).

She is a Fellow of the American Statistical Association. She was editor of the Journal of Computational and Graphical Statistics from 2016 to 2018.
