= Yang Feng (statistician) =

Professor of biostatistics

- 冯阳
- Education: Princeton University (PhD); University of Science and Technology of China (BS)
- Scientific career
- Fields: Statistics; Machine Learning; Biostatistics
- Workplaces: New York University; Columbia University
- Thesis: High-dimensional Statistical Learning and Nonparametric Modeling (2010)
- Doctoral advisors: Jianqing Fan
- Website: https://yangfengstat.github.io/

Yang Feng (Chinese: 冯阳; pinyin: Féng Yáng) is a statistician and data scientist. He is a professor of biostatistics in the School of Global Public Health at New York University. He is also serving as an affiliate faculty member at both the NYU Center for Data Science and the NYU Center for Practice and Research at the Intersection of Information, Society, and Methodology.

== Education and career ==
Feng received his B.S. in Mathematics from Special Class for the Gifted Young in University of Science and Technology of China in 2006. He earned his Ph.D. in Operations Research from Princeton University in 2010, under the supervision of Jianqing Fan.

Following his doctorate, Feng joined the faculty of the Department of Statistics at Columbia University, where he served before moving to New York University in 2019.

== Research ==
Feng’s research lies at the intersection of modern statistics and machine learning, emphasizing both theoretical development and methodological innovation. His work covers:

- High-dimensional statistics such as variable selection, screening, and graphical models.
- Machine learning topics including transfer learning, multi-task learning, and federated learning.
- Network science including community detection and network embedding.
- Applications to public health, genomics, epidemiology, neuroscience, and computer vision.

== Honors and recognition ==
In 2016, Feng received an National Science Foundation CAREER Award.

In 2017, Feng became an elected member of the International Statistical Institute (ISI).

In 2022, he was elected a Fellow of the American Statistical Association (ASA) “for development of effective, practical, and efficient statistical methods that are backed by theory and are relevant and accessible to practitioners; for wide dissemination of methods in publicly available software; and for outstanding teaching.”

In 2023, he was named a Fellow of the Institute of Mathematical Statistics (IMS) "for outstanding contributions to high-dimensional statistics, nonparametric statistics, social network analysis, and statistical machine learning; for statistical software development; and for dedicated service to the profession."

=== Editorial service ===
Feng has held editorial positions at several leading statistics journals. He currently serves as Reviews Editor for the Journal of the American Statistical Association and for The American Statistician for the 2026–2028 term. He has also served as Associate Editor for journals including:

- Annals of Applied Statistics
- Computational Statistics & Data Analysis
- Journal of Business and Economic Statistics
- Journal of Computational and Graphical Statistics
- Journal of the American Statistical Association: Theory and Methods
- Stat
- Statistica Sinica
- Statistical Analysis and Data Mining: The ASA Data Science Journal
