= Mondrian (software) =

Statistical data-visualization software

- Developer: Martin Theus
- First appeared: 1997
- Stable release: 1.2 / January 11, 2011; 14 years ago
- Preview release: 1.5.3 / December 31, 2021; 3 years ago
- OS: Windows, macOS, Linux
- License: GNU GPL 3+
- Website: www.theusrus.de/Mondrian/

Mondrian is a general-purpose statistical data-visualization system, for interactive data visualization.

All plots in Mondrian are fully linked, and offer various interactions and queries. Any case selected in a plot in Mondrian is highlighted in all other plots. Currently implemented plots comprise Mosaic Plot, Scatterplots and SPLOM, Maps, Barcharts, Histograms, Missing Value Plot, Parallel Coordinates/Boxplots and Boxplots y by x. Mondrian works with data in standard tab-delimited or comma-separated ASCII files and can load data from R workspaces. There is basic support for working directly on data in databases. Mondrian links to R and offers statistical procedures like interactive density estimation, scatterplot smoothers, multidimensional scaling (MDS) and principal component analysis (PCA).

== Overview ==
Starting in 1997, Mondrian was first developed with a focus on visualization techniques for categorical data and enhanced selection techniques. Over the years, a complete suite of visualizations for univariate and multivariate data measured on any scale were added. The link to R offers well tested statistical procedures, which integrate seamlessly into the interactive graphics. Today, even geographical data is supported with highly interactive maps.

== Mondrian details ==
Last stable and beta versions, help and documentations are available on the developer web site, Martin Theus

=== Supported data sources ===
Mondrian works on plain text files with tab-separated columns with variable header, as exported from Microsoft Excel as ".txt". If the Rserve link and R are present, Mondrian also reads data directly from R workspace files (.RData files).

=== Visualizations ===
- 1-d: Barchart, Spineplot, Histogram, Spinogram, Boxplot
- 2-d: Scatterplot, Boxplot y by x
- High-D:
  - Multivariate continuous: Scatterplot matrix, Parallel coordinates
  - Multivariate categorical: Mosaic plot (see also Treemapping)
- Geographical: Map
- Special: missing value plot

=== Interaction techniques ===
Mondrian supports Query, Select, and Modify.

== See also ==
- Data visualization
- GGobi
