= Architect (disambiguation) =

An architect is a professional trained in the planning, design, and supervision of the construction of buildings.

Architect may also refer to:

== Arts, entertainment, and media ==
=== Films ===
- Die Architekten (The Architects), a 1990 East German film about the building of a satellite town
- The Architect (2006 film), a drama film about an architect who is confronted by angry residents of a housing complex he designed.
- The Architect (2016 film), a comedy-drama film starring Parker Posey

=== Literature ===
- The Architect (novel), a novel by Australian author John Scott
- The Architect, 1974 novel by Uzbek writer Mirmukhsin
- The Architects, novel by Stefan Heym 1965

=== Music ===
==== Groups and labels ====
- Architect (band), an American hardcore band
- Architect, an alias for Daniel Meyer, electronic musician in the Haujobb project
- Architects (American band), a rock band from Kansas City, Missouri
- Architects (British band), a metalcore band from Brighton, England
- Architechs, a British music group
- Arkitekt, a British music group

==== Albums ====
- Architect (album), an album by Irish singer-songwriter Wallis Bird
- Architect, a musical side project by Daniel Myer of Haujobb
- The Architect (Paloma Faith album), 2017
- The Architect (Eidola album), 2021
- The Architect, album by Kerry Muzzey 2014
- The Architect, EP by Nyam Nyam 1985

==== Songs ====
- "Architects" (song), a song by Rise Against from the album Endgame
- "The Architect" (Kacey Musgraves song), a song from Deeper Well, 2024
- "The Architects", a song by At the Gates from With Fear I Kiss the Burning Darkness 1993
- "The Architect", a song by The Charlatans from Simpatico 2006
- "The Architect", a song by The Crimson Armada from Guardians 2009
- "The Architect", a song from Doctor Who: Series 8 2015
- "The Architect", a song by Deus from Vantage Point, 2009
- "The Architect", a song by Erra from Impulse, 2011
- "The Architect", a song by Fit for a King from Descendants, 2011
- "The Architect", a song by Haken from Affinity, 2016
- "The Architects", a song by It Dies Today from Lividity, 2009
- "The Architect", a song by Miss May I from Apologies Are for the Weak, 2009
- "The Architect", a song by Paloma Faith from The Architect, 2017
- "The Architect", a song by Red Light Company from Fine Fascination, 2009
- "The Architect", a song by Shrinebuilder from Shrinebuilder, 2009

=== Other arts, entertainment, and media ===
- Architect (The Matrix), a character in the latter two Matrix films
- Architect (magazine), an American magazine

== Other uses ==
- Architect (role variant), a personality type in the Keirsey Temperament Sorter
- Architect (software), an open source integrated development environment
- Systems architect, a profession in information and communications technology

== See also ==
- Parkitect, a 2018 construction and management game
- Architecture (disambiguation)
