= GGobi =

Statistical software package

- Developer: Deborah F. Swayne, Michael Lawrence, Hadley Wickham, Duncan Temple Lang, Di Cook, Heike Hofmann and Andreas Buja
- Stable release: 2.1.10.a / 10 June 2012; 14 years ago
- OS: Windows, OS X, Linux
- License: GNU GPL, BSD, CPL
- Website: www.ggobi.org

GGobi is a free statistical software tool for interactive data visualization. GGobi allows extensive exploration of the data with Interactive dynamic graphics. It is also a tool for looking at multivariate data. R can be used in sync with GGobi (through rggobi). The GGobi software can be embedded as a library in other programs and program packages using an application programming interface (API) (integration into a stand-alone application) or as an add-on to existing languages and scripting environments, e.g., with the R command line or from a Perl or Python scripts. GGobi prides itself on its ability to link multiple graphs together.

== Overview ==
GGobi was created to look at data matrices. The designers were interested in exploring multi-dimensional data. The program developers went through many name changes before settling on GGobi (A combination of the words GTK+ and the Gobi Desert). The original concept, Dataviewer, began in the mid-80s, and a predecessor, XGobi, began in 1989. Work began on the current version of GGobi in 1999. The main reason for the different versions was the change in technology. Current version for MS Windows is 2.1.10a (12 March 2010) with an update for 64 bit usage from 10 June 2012.

Released under a combination of three free software licenses, GGobi is free software.

== GGobi Topics ==
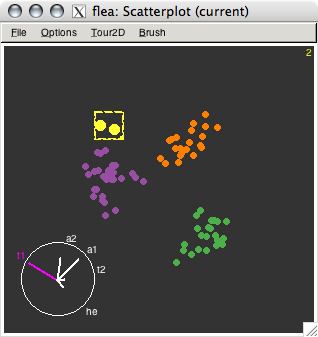
This shows a projection from a 2D tour of 6D, where three clusters are visible. Two points are highlighted as yellow, which appear in the same color in other plots.

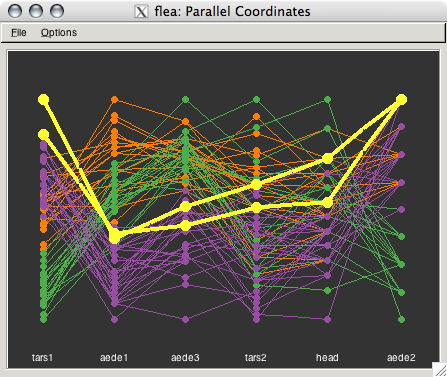
Parallel coordinate plot linked to scatterplot, show traces of the two points highlighted in the scatterplot

=== Importance of graphics ===
Looking at data through various graphs can reveal more information about the distribution than just looking at the numbers or a summary of them. Using the different tools within GGobi, clusters, non-linear distributions, outliers, and other important variations in the data can be discovered. GGobi is a program which allows exploratory data analysis to occur for multi-dimensional data.

=== Supported data sources ===
GGobi can read CSV and XML file types.

=== Types of graphics ===
- 1D: Average shifted histogram, textured dot plot, barchart, spineplot
- 2D: Scatterplot
- High-D:
  - Scatterplot matrix
  - Parallel coordinates
  - Grand tour, projection pursuit guided tour, manual tour
- Time series plot

=== Interactions ===
These tools can be used to pick out special points or clusters of data.

- Brushing

As the brush moves over a point, the point will be highlighted.
If "persistent" is selected, the points the brush has moved over will remain "painted".

- Identify

As the cursor moves over a point, a label, or variable value will appear at the top of the graphic screen.

- Linking

Multiple plots are linked so identifying one point in one plot will identify the same point on all other graphs, and brushing a group of points in one plot will highlight the same points in other plots. The linking can be one-to-one, or according to the values of a categorical variable in the data set.

- Moving points

Points in a plot can be moved interactively, e.g. to gauge results from multidimensional scaling.

- Add/remove points or edges.

== See also ==
- Data visualization
- Mondrian data analysis
