= Yihui Xie =

Chinese software developer

- 谢益辉
- Born: Yichang, Hubei, China
- Education: Renmin University (BEc, MEc); Iowa State University (PhD)
- Known for: Knitr; Bookdown
- Scientific career
- Fields: Statistics; Statistical graphics Statistical computing Reproducible research
- Workplaces: Posit PBC
- Thesis: Dynamic Graphics and Reporting for Statistics (2013)
- Doctoral advisor: Dianne Cook; Heike Hofmann
- Website: yihui.org

Yihui Xie (谢益辉) is a Chinese software developer who previously worked for Posit PBC. He is the principal author of the open-source software package Knitr for dynamic report generation in the R programming language, and has also written the book Dynamic Documents with R and knitr.

== Early life and education ==
Xie is a native of Yichang, Hubei, China.

Xie received a Bachelor of Economics in 2006 and a Master of Economics in 2009, both in statistics and from the Renmin University of China. He received a Doctor of Philosophy in statistics from Iowa State University in 2013. His doctoral advisors at Iowa State University were Di Cook and Heike Hofmann.

== Career ==
Yihui Xie created the animation package in R which allows animation in graphics through R. He then authored the knitr package which makes reproducible research available from R. Between 2013 and 2023, he worked with RStudio, the makers of an Integrated development environment (IDE) for the R programming language.

Xie was awarded the John M. Chambers statistical software award by American Statistical Association (ASA) in 2009 for the R package animation.

=== Publications ===
His publications include:

- R Markdown Cookbook
- R Markdown: The Definitive Guide
- blogdown: Creating Websites with R Markdown
- bookdown: Authoring Books and Technical Documents with R Markdown
- Dynamic Documents with R and knitr
- animation: An R Package for Creating Animations and Demonstrating Statistical Methods
