= Antony Unwin =

Statistician, software developer

Antony Richard Unwin (born 23 January 1950 in Belfast) is an academic statistician and software developer. He is known for his work on interactive statistical graphics and the development of exploratory statistical software for large data sets using the programming language R.

== Life ==
Unwin studied Mathematics and Statistics in Cambridge (M.A.) and London (M.Sc.). In 1982 he earned a PhD degree from Trinity College Dublin with a thesis entitled "Dual resource queueing models" under the supervision of Frederic Gordon Foster. He served as Lecturer (1978-1988) and Senior Lecturer (1988-1993) in Operations Research and Statistics with Trinity College, Dublin University.

In 1993 Unwin transferred to Germany to the Institute for Mathematics of the University of Augsburg where he became the first professor for Computer-oriented Statistics and Data Analysis (Rechnerorientierte Statistik und Datenanalyse - ROSUDA), a new chair established with the support of the Volkswagen Foundation. He retired from the Augsburg chair in 2016.

== Work ==
Unwin supervised fourteen PhD students in Dublin and Augsburg among whom Heike Hofmann is known for her work on data visualization.

Unwin has worked with Andrew Gelman, who is the applied statistics director at Columbia University. In 2010 Unwin was a judge for The Statistical Computing and Graphics Award. In January 2020 Unwin spoke out against the latest AIGA Design Census, saying "it’s very disappointing. I would expect something better from such an august body."

== Recognition ==
Unwin is a fellow of the American Statistical Association (elected in 2007), and of the Royal Statistical Society. He is a member of the International Statistical Institute, the International Association for Statistical Computing (serving as European Section Chairman 1998-2000), and the Deutsche Statistische Gesellschaft.

== Books ==
Unwin, Antony; Theus, Martin; Hofmann, Heike (2006). Graphics of Large Datasets - Visualizing a Million. Springer. ISBN 0-387-32906-4. OCLC 209923341.

Chen, Chun-houh; Härdle, Wolfgang Karl; Unwin, Antony (2008). Handbook of Data Visualization. Springer. ISBN 978-3-540-33037-0. OCLC 233973125.

Unwin, Antony R. (2015). Graphical Data Analysis with R. CRC Press. ISBN 978-1-4987-1523-2. OCLC 949422669.
