= Heike Hofmann =

German statistician

- Born: 16 April 1972 (age 54); Augsburg, West Germany
- Education: University of Augsburg (MSc, PhD)
- Known for: interactive data visualization ggobi
- Awards: Fellow of the American Statistical Association (2014)
- Scientific career
- Fields: Statistical graphics Exploratory Data Analysis; Visual inference Visualization of Large Data; Statistical computing
- Workplaces: Iowa State University; University of Nebraska–Lincoln
- Thesis: Graphical Tools for the Exploration of Multivariate Categorical Data (2000)
- Doctoral advisor: Antony Unwin
- Doctoral students: Hadley Wickham; Yihui Xie
- Website: www.stat.iastate.edu/people/heike-hofmann

Heike Hofmann (born 16 April 1972) is a statistician and Professor in the Department of Statistics at University of Nebraska–Lincoln and was previously at Iowa State University.

== Education ==
She earned an MSc in Mathematics, with a minor in Computer Science, and a PhD in Statistics, from the University of Augsburg, Augsburg, Germany in 1998 and 2000, respectively.

== Career and research ==
Hofmann's research interests are in statistical graphics, exploratory data analysis, visual inference, visualization of large data and statistical computing She is currently Professor in the Department of Statistics at Iowa State University, and faculty member of the Bioinformatics and Computational Biology and Human Computer Interaction programs.

In her research on interactive data visualization she has provided new approaches for plotting multivariate categorical data using mosaic plots, and making interactions with these plots, and linking between plots. She was the primary development of the software MANET and contributed to the development of the software GGobi. More recent software include the R packages x3prplus, geomnet, nullabor, gglogo, peptider, discreteRV, ggboxplots, ggparallel, dbData, HLMdiag, lvboxplots, MergeGUI, MissingDataGUI. Her work on examining the inflow of corporate cash into the 2012 US presidential election can be read in Chance magazine.

Heike Hofmann is the author of more than 50 journal articles, conference proceedings, book chapters and edited one book. She is a Fellow of the American Statistical Association. She has supervised or co-supervised 8 doctoral theses, including Hadley Wickham and Yihui Xie.

=== Honors and awards ===
She was elected a Fellow of the American Statistical Association in 2014.
