= Deborah F. Swayne =

American statistician (born 1952)

Deborah F. Swayne (born 6 January 1952) is an American statistician who worked for AT&T Labs and chaired the Section on Statistical Graphics of the American Statistical Association. She is known for her work as coauthor of GGobi, a software tool for interactive data visualization, and is president of the GGobi Foundation. She retired in 2016.

With Dianne Cook, she is the author of Interactive and Dynamic Graphics for Data Analysis: With R and GGobi (Springer, 2007).

In 2005, Swayne was elected as a fellow of the American Statistical Association, "for influential contributions in statistical graphics methods; for the creation of advanced graphical software; and for exemplary service to the profession."
