= Harvey balls =

Graphic symbols used to compare quality

Harvey balls are round ideograms used for visual communication of qualitative information. They are commonly used in comparison tables to indicate the degree to which a particular item meets a particular criterion.

For example, in a comparison of products, information such as price or weight can be conveyed numerically, and binary information such as the existence or lack of a feature can be conveyed with a check mark; however, information such as "quality" or "safety" or "taste" is often difficult to summarize in a manner allowing easy comparison – thus, Harvey balls are used.

In addition to their use in qualitative comparison, Harvey balls are also commonly used in project management for project tracking; in lean manufacturing for value-stream mapping and continuous improvement tracking; and in business process modeling software for visualisation.

Harvey L. Poppel is generally credited with inventing Harvey balls in the 1970s while working at Booz Allen Hamilton as head of their worldwide IT consulting practice.

== Implementations and support ==
=== Scalable Vector Graphics ===
The SVG version of Harvey balls above also includes the original Booz Allen Hamilton style balls on the top row and the former Consumer Reports style on the bottom row. The middle rows contain alternative versions.

Scalable Vector Graphics is used in web browsers and applications to render Harvey balls, via the XML vector graphics format.

=== Microsoft Excel ===
Harvey balls are available within Microsoft Excel since Excel 2007.

=== Custom fonts ===
Custom fonts have been developed such that the numbers 0–9 map to a particular Harvey ball. Incorporating the Harvey ball into a document then becomes a matter of selecting the number which corresponds to the desired Harvey ball and selecting the custom font. The Harvey balls can then be manipulated like any other font (e.g., color, size, underline) and may be easier to use than other implementations. The main drawback of this approach is that the font either needs to be embedded in the document or all the viewers of the document must have the font installed.

=== Unicode ===
The use of Unicode to render Harvey balls depends on whether a font with these characters is installed; the Unicode Harvey balls may be difficult to work with in software that does not render these characters uniformly.

The Unicode set of related symbols includes:

Symbol	Unicode code point (hex)	(decimal)	Name
⭘	U+2B58	11096	Heavy circle
⬤	U+2B24	11044	Black large circle
◐	U+25D0	9680	Circle with left half black
◑	U+25D1	9681	Circle with right half black
◒	U+25D2	9682	Circle with lower half black
◓	U+25D3	9683	Circle with upper half black
◔	U+25D4	9684	Circle with upper right quadrant black
◕	U+25D5	9685	Circle with all but upper left quadrant black

== Modifications and other uses ==
From 1979 through October 2016, Consumer Reports used a modified type of Harvey ball in product ratings and had even incorporated one into its logo.

Some of the symbols used for Harvey balls are also used in other fields to represent other types of information:

Symbol	Uses
⭘	Astronomy: (Full moon)
⬤	Astronomy: (New moon)
◐	Astronomy: (First quarter moon)
◑	Astronomy: (Last quarter moon); electronics: (on/off switch, television contrast)
◒	Cartography: (Spring or well)
◓	Meteorology: (Partly overcast)
◔	Meteorology: (Almost clear sky or somewhat overcast)
◕	Meteorology: (Broken clouds)

== See also ==
- Radar graph, also used for comparisons
- Okta, similar symbols used in meteorology
