= Air Support Operations Center =

Air Support Operations Center (ASOC) is a USDoD term for a subsection of a Theater Air Control System (TACS) located near a corps headquarters or some other land force headquarters, which directs and oversees close air support and similar sorts of tactical air support.

Controls Tactical Air Control Party (TACP) and Forward Air Control (Airborne) (FAC(A)) as coordinated with Land Component Commander (LCC) under the Air Operations Center (AOC) guidance and leadership for respective Joint Force Air Component Commander (JFACC). The term is sometimes modified by the addition of words like "mobile" or "maritime" to describe a more specific form of this unit. The First Training for the new Tactical Operation was on 3/20/2008 at NELLIS AIR FORCE BASE, Nev. -- The 505th Command and Control Wing announced a new Air Support Operations Center Initial Qualification Course beginning March 31 for battlefield airmen at the Combined Air Operations Center here.

After two years from concept to validation, the long-awaited ASOC course was announced March 12, simultaneously celebrating the 505th CCW's fourth year of progress in operational command and control excellence during the "Virtual Flag" joint warfighting simulation exercise at the Combined Air Operations Center here.

The ASOC course is designed to provide vital training for high-demand battlefield Airmen attached to Army divisions or corps. This course fuses the gap between operational and tactical levels to provide the full spectrum of air, space and cyber capabilities to ground commanders for kinetic and non-kinetic effects, said Lt. Col. Robert D. Beckel, 505th Operations Group deputy commander. The ASOC inaugural course already has 14 students enrolled, the maximum for each three-week course. Four ASOC courses will be taught the first year, six the second year, with the expectation this will increase to nine courses a year aligning with the high priority Joint Task Force planning requirements for battlefield Airmen in the Army's Transformation Plan 2012.

"The first week will focus on academics, to include doctrine. The second week will train on six primary command and control systems students will see in combat, using practice simulations and role rehearsals. The third week will consist of practical exercises in a crawl, walk, run phase approved for training Airmen to exercise command and control while functioning as battlefield Airmen," said Colonel Beckel.

Seven contractors hired in October 2007 had less than five months to finalize the course. Seven additional contractors were hired to build practical exercises and validate the course.

"This was a Herculean effort by the whole team tapping multiple resources resulting in a Total Force effort," said Colonel Beckel.

Airmen who complete the course would be qualified in one of three areas: as an ASOC Fighter Duty Officer, filled by officers, an ASOC Fighter Technician, filled by enlisted Airmen, or an Intelligence Duty Officer, filled by either enlisted Airmen or officers.

Prior to this course, ASOC designated battlefield Airmen trained in multiple venues, which only partially prepared them for working in the joint environment. The new ASOC course will finally give our Airmen procedural command and control over the ever-increasing demand of complex air space brought on by helicopter, UAV, or civilian aircraft, said Colonel Beckel.

DOD Defined The principal air control agency of the theater air control system responsible for the direction and control of air operations directly supporting the ground combat element. It processes and coordinates requests for immediate air support and coordinates air missions requiring integration with other supporting arms and ground forces. It normally collocates with the Army tactical headquarters senior fire support coordination center within the ground combat element. Also called ASOC. See also air support; close air support; operation; tactical air control center.
