= Gepanzerte Pioniermaschine =

Gepanzerte Pioniermaschine (GPM) was the design for two prototype armored engineer vehicles for the Bundeswehr.

At the end of the 1960s, it was determined hitherto the forward troops demanded a better answer than the Pionierpanzer 2 currently in use, and in 1972, research began on the development of an improved successor. The firms Eisenwerke Kaiserslautern (EWK, now Santa Barbara Systems, a division of General Dynamics) and Maschinenbau Kiel (MAK) were each commissioned to build prototypes.

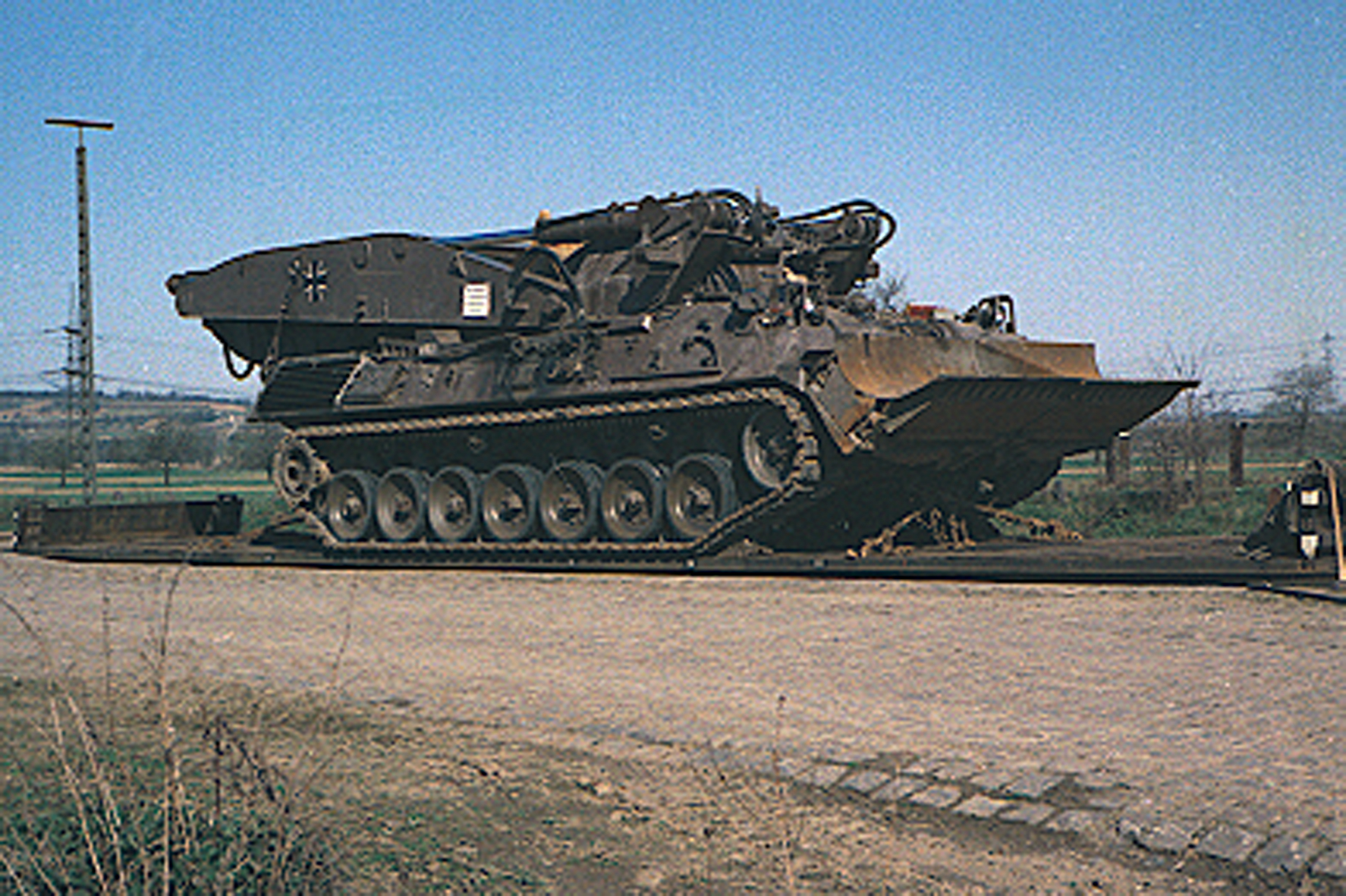
MAK's Gepanzerte Pioniermaschine prototype being transported.

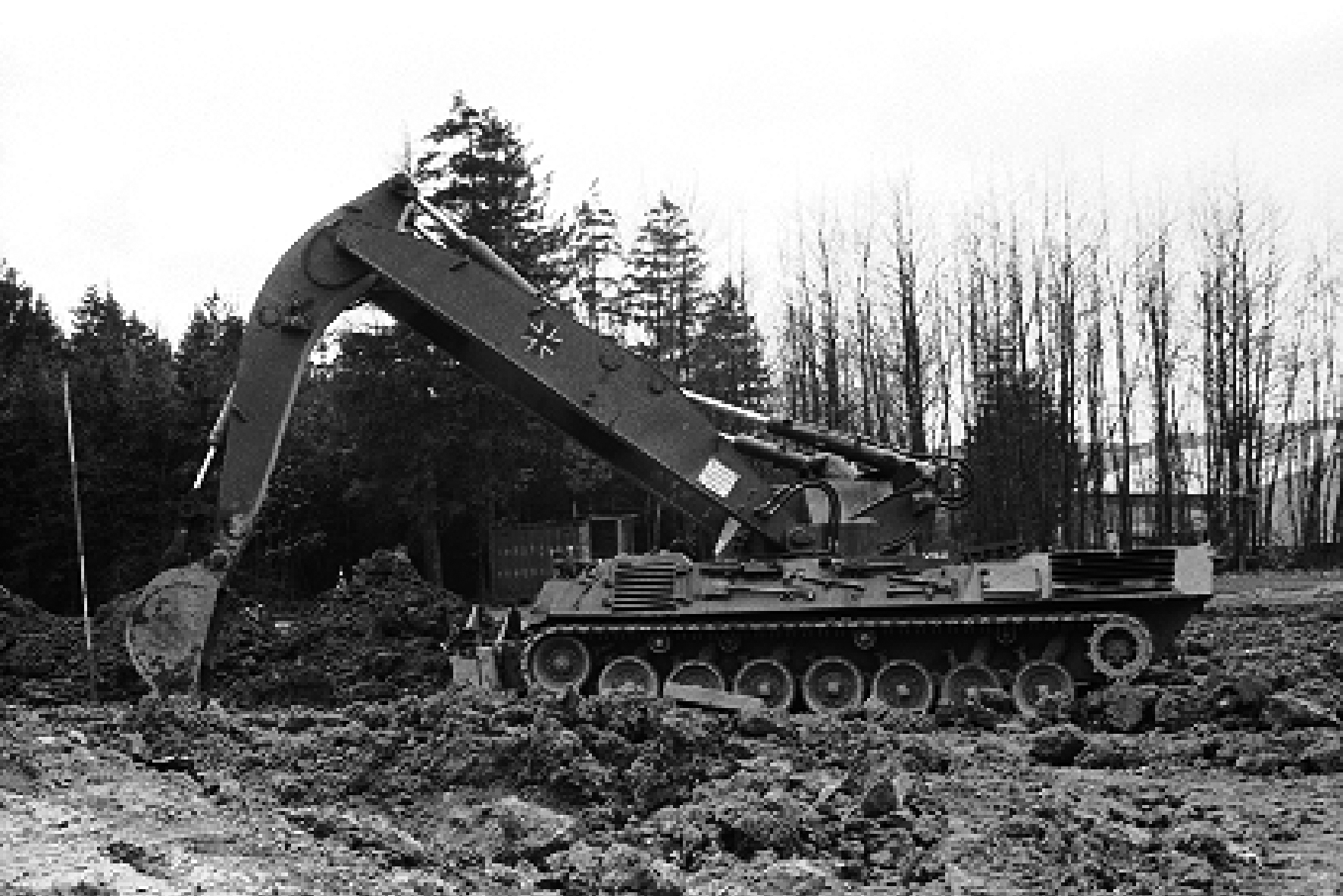
MAK's Gepanzerte Pioniermaschine on field trials, January 1977.

Hull, running gear, and drivetrain were derived from the Bergepanzer 2A1.

- GPM 1 MAK (Maschinenbau Kiel)

Frame-arm line dredge in a rotating citadel (resembling a turret)
Range of motion 360°
Arrangements for the vehicle commander, dredging operator, and driver
Amidships on the left and right sides are folding 3.75m diameter scissor spades to hold the vehicle stationary and prevent it moving when deployed
Digging performance: about 300 m³ (10,600 ft³)/h
Trenching depth of the digging shovel: about 5 m (15 ft)
35 ton capacity winch
Gradient crossing assisted by digging shovel: about 70%
Operator and vehicle commander in turret
Weight 55 tons maximum

Due to the overweight of the system, the engine compartment was covered with an aluminum plate

With the digging shovel sideways, despite suggestions, it is incapable of digging the road out from under itself.

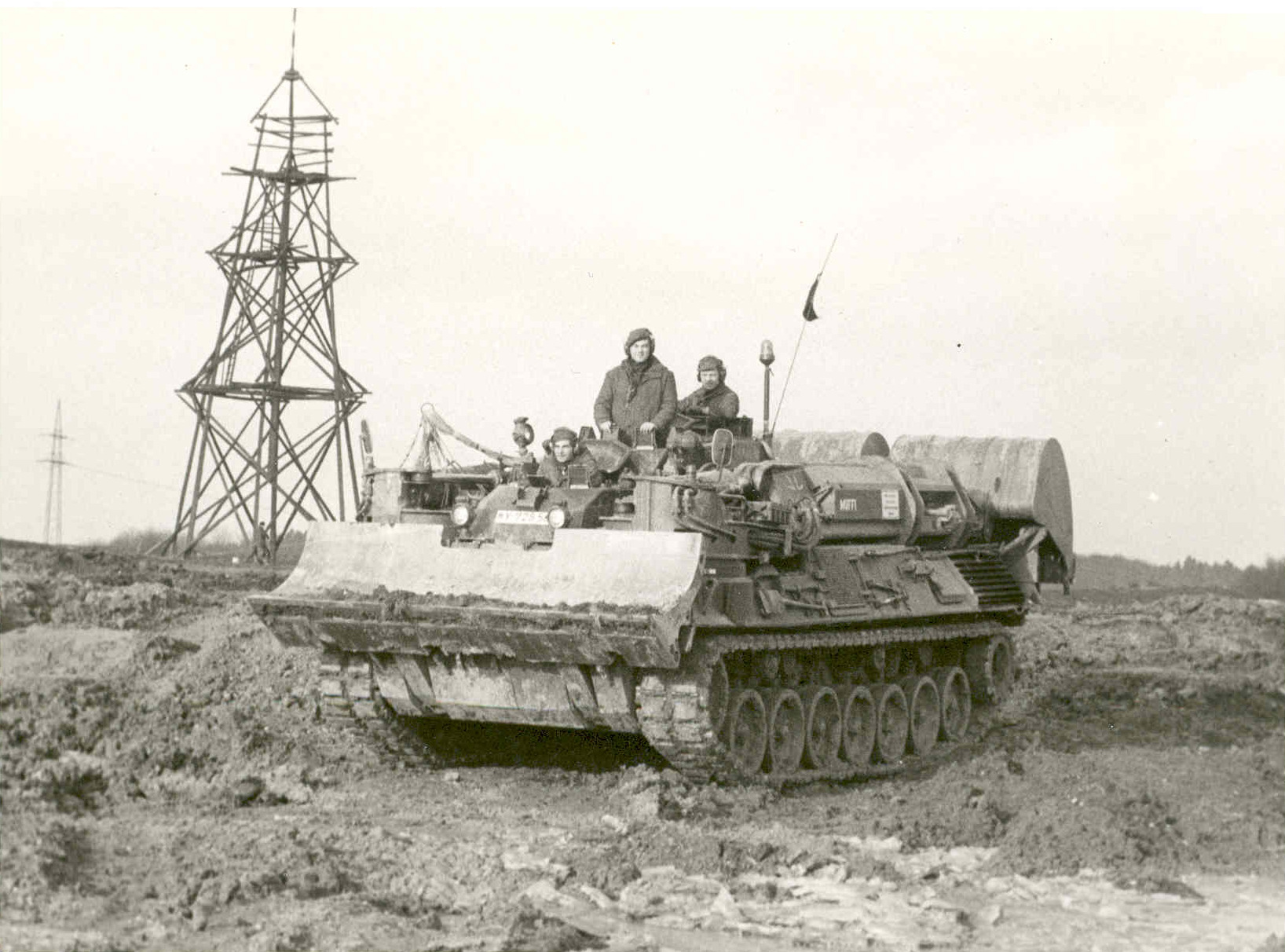
EWK's Gepanzerte Pioniermaschine prototype on field trials, January 1977.

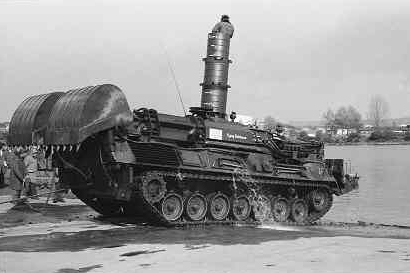
EWK's prototype, snorkel deployed, after deep wading.

- GPM 2 EWK (Eisenwerke Kaiserslautern)

Front-mounted dozer blade, operated by two pivoting hydraulic telescopic arms

Range of motion 195°
The crew space features driver (and dozer blade operator) in front, telescoping arms operator and vehicle commander in a row behind him

Usually the driver operates with the right telescoping arm and the operator with the left telescoping arm. The operator was able to work with both telescoping arms and oversteering the driver.

Adjustable-angle dozer blade
Digging performance: about 300 m³ (10,600 ft³)/h
Gradient crossing assisted by digging shovel telescoping arms (pushing): about 85%
Trenching depth: about 6 m (20 ft) (4.5 m {15 ft} without shovel operator being able to observe the work)
35 ton capacity winch
Weight 57 tons maximum

Trials were carried out between 1976 and 1980 and were successfully completed at the Pionierschule (Army School for Engineers and Construction) in Munich (now in Ingolstadt) and at Bundeswehr Engineers Equipment an Fuel Transportation Systems Test Center (ErprSt 51/now WTD 51), Koblenz.

Several problems remained unresolved:

The total weight was too much for drivetrain and chassis
The overall workmanship did not meet requirements
The hydraulics were too complex and troublesome
The interior layout was entirely wrong
The project was better shown the door rather than pay for correcting the problems

Bundeswehr decided instead of developing the Pionierpanzer Dachs, it would work on improving the existing PiPz 1. The main outstanding task is the replacement of the single arm crane of the PiPz 1 with the EWK's telescoping shovel.

== Sources ==
- F.M. von Senger und Etterlin: Tanks of the World 1983. Arms and Armor Press, London 1983, ISBN 0-85368-585-1
- Vorl. Technische Dienstvorschrift: Gepanzerte Pioniermaschine. GPM 1 und GPM 2, Teil 22. BmVg 1974
