= Robert Kiviat =

Robert Kiviat is a television writer and producer specializing in paranormal phenomena. He has produced 11 specials for 20th Century Fox Television, most notably Alien Autopsy. Robert has also often appeared as a guest expert on numerous television news shows, such as MSNBC's Countdown with Keith Olbermann, and on popular radio shows such as Coast to Coast AM, Art Bell, and The Jeff and Mike Show. He has been featured on Entertainment Tonight multiple times, Access Hollywood, and CNN's Show Biz Tonight.

Originally from New York, Robert Kiviat relocated to Hollywood after producing mystery segments for Geraldo Rivera's TV newsmagazine Now It Can Be Told, and after writing a cover article for OMNI Magazine about the supposed Face on Mars, a mile-wide mesa photographed by NASA.

Robert was soon asked to join NBC's Unsolved Mysteries. Soon the Fox Network brought Robert in for a phenomenon-based show called Encounters, and shortly thereafter Robert secured exclusive rights to the footage that was the basis for his first Fox TV Special, Alien Autopsy: Fact or Fiction?.

== Productions ==
- Aliens On The Moon: The Truth Exposed
- I Shot JFK: The Shocking Truth
- World's Greatest Hoaxes: Secrets Finally Revealed
- Miracles and Visions: Fact or Fiction?
- Prophecies of the Millennium
- UFOs: The Best Evidence Ever Caught on Tape
- UFOs: The Best Evidence Ever Caught on Tape 2
- Ghosts Caught on Tape: Fact or Fiction?
- Alien Autopsy: (Fact or Fiction?)
- Alien Autopsy: The True Story
- Why In The World Do They Do That?
- Unsolved Mysteries
