= Architect (software) =

Open-source integrated development environment

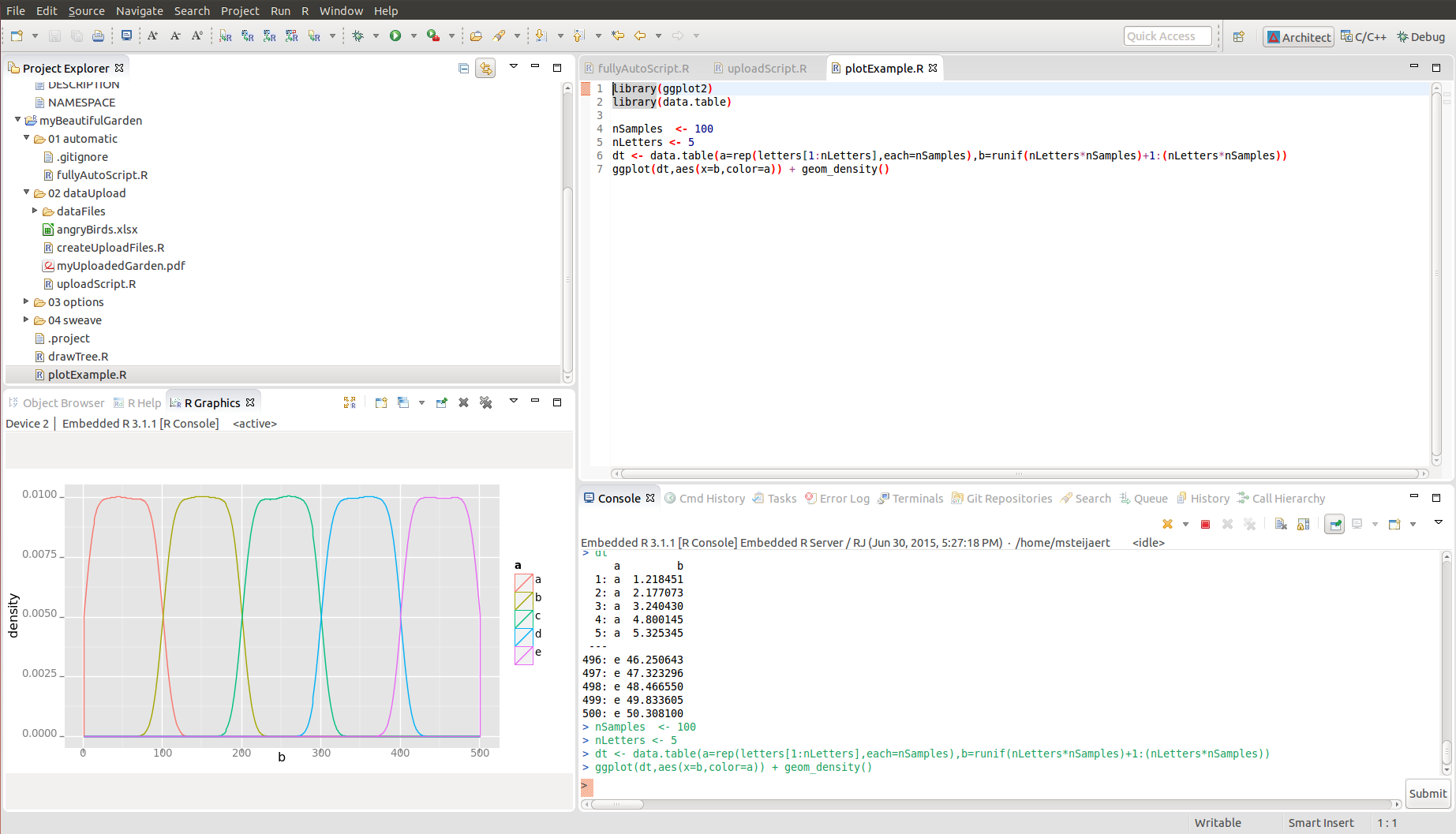
- Stable release: 1.0.0 / January 28, 2022; 3 years ago
- Operating system: Cross-platform: Linux (Ubuntu), Mac OS X, Windows
- Platform: Java SE, Standard Widget Toolkit
- Available in: Multilingual
- Website: getarchitect.io

Architect is an open-source integrated development environment (IDE), based on Eclipse. It serves as a multi-purpose workbench for data scientists, by providing support for various programming languages and technologies.

Integrated development environments are software applications that support computer programmers and data scientists in their work. In a single program interface, it provides one or more source code editors, syntax highlighting and functionality for building or executing the code. Within the broad family of IDEs, Architect primarily aims at applications in data science. Originally, it primarily focussed on the (statistical) programming language R. Over time, it has developed towards a more universal platform for modern data science.

== Data science workbench ==
Through the StatET plugin, Architect provides full support for the R programming language. It supports the use of multiple R consoles in which R code can be executed. It also provides syntax highlighting and an integrated debugger. In addition, it is possible to set up a remote R session on a server using Architect Server.

Architect also provides out of the box support for Git (distributed revision control), LaTeX, Sweave / knitr, C, C++, Java and the Mylyn task management system.

== Customization ==
An advantage of Eclipse over most other IDEs is that is provides many possibilities for further customization to the needs and wishes of the end user. The long list of available Eclipse plug-ins provide support for virtually any programming language. For example, Architect can be easily extended by adding support for the Python programming language (by using the PyDev plug-in) or for the creation of Docker software containers.
