= Journal of Computational and Graphical Statistics =

- Discipline: Statistics
- Language: English
- Edited by: Galin Jones, Faming Liang

Publication details
- History: 1992–present
- Publisher: Taylor & Francis on behalf of the American Statistical Association and the Institute of Mathematical Statistics (United States)
- Frequency: Quarterly
- Impact factor: 2.4 (2022)

Standard abbreviations
- ISO 4: J. Comput. Graph. Stat.
- MathSciNet: J. Comput. Graph. Statist.

Indexing
- ISSN: 1061-8600 (print); 1537-2715 (web)
- LCCN: 92642563
- OCLC no.: 901043326

Links
- Journal homepage; Online access; Online archive

The Journal of Computational and Graphical Statistics is a quarterly peer-reviewed scientific journal published by Taylor & Francis on behalf of the American Statistical Association. Established in 1992, the journal covers the use of computational and graphical methods in statistics and data analysis, including numerical methods, graphical displays and methods, and perception. It is published jointly with the Institute of Mathematical Statistics and the Interface Foundation of North America. According to the Journal Citation Reports, the journal has a 2021 impact factor of 1.884.

== See also ==
- List of statistics journals
