= Fleet commonality =

Standardization of aircraft parts

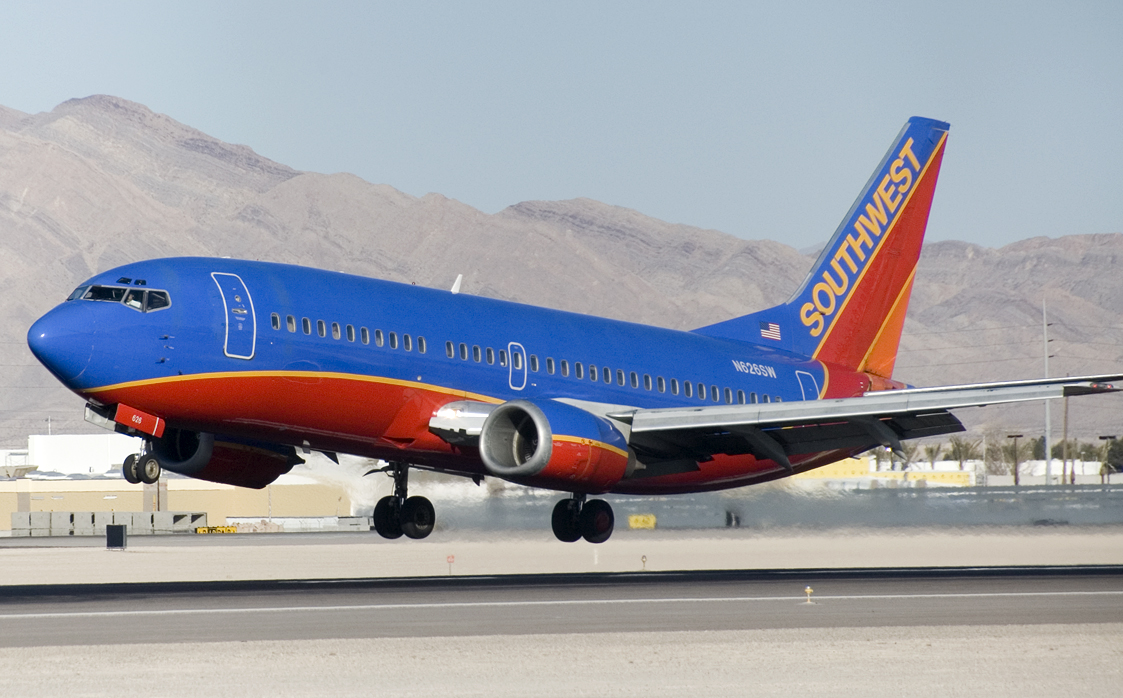
Southwest Airlines has operated a pure Boeing 737 fleet since 1971, operating nearly every variant of the type.

In aviation, fleet commonality is the economic and logistic benefits of operating a standardized fleet of aircraft that share common parts, training requirements, or other characteristics. Fleet commonality has been shown to be positively associated with operating performance.

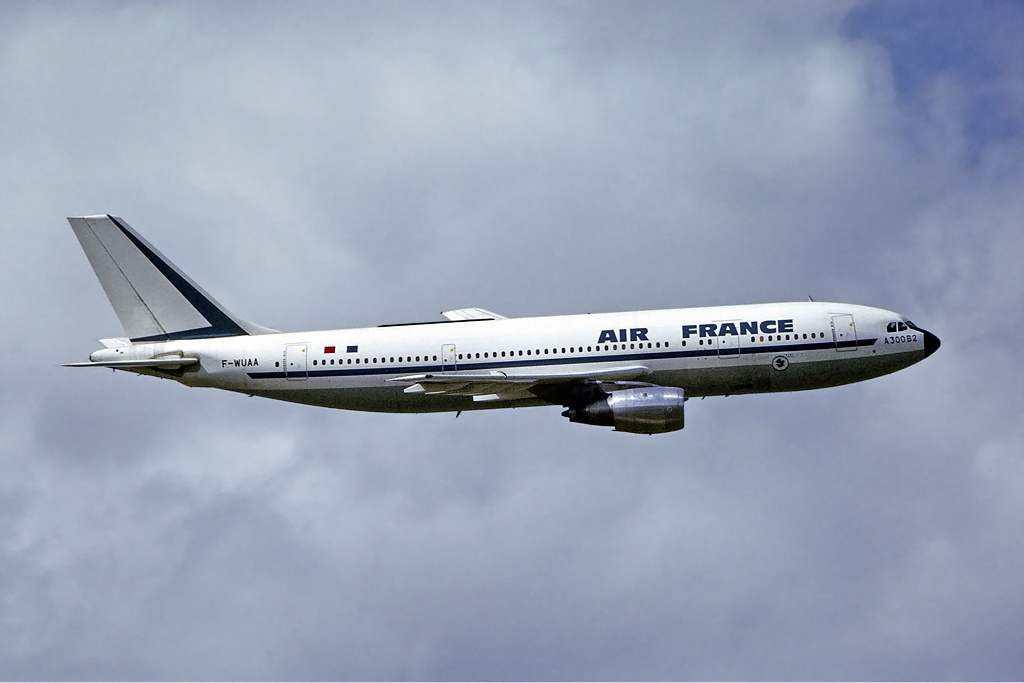
An Air France Airbus A300 in 1974. The first client of Airbus is among the companies who have (or have had) all the Airbus models (A300, A310, A318, A319, A320, A321, A330, A340, A350 and A380). According to Air France, the subsequent commonality within the fleet has a "significant economic impact"
