= Mobility (military) =

Ease with which a military asset can move

Mobility in military terms refers to the ability of a weapon system, combat unit or armed force to move toward a military objective. Combat forces with a higher mobility are able to move more quickly, and/or across more hostile terrain, than forces with lower mobility.

Mobility is regarded as a vital component of the modern battlefield, as the ability to deliver weapon systems or combat units to their objective quickly can often mean the difference between victory and defeat. Armies around the world have massively increased their mobility over the last 100 years. In World War I, for example, most combat units could move on the battlefield only as fast as a soldier could walk. In the face of overwhelming firepower presented by machine guns and artillery, that resulted in stalemate and an inability to outmaneuver the enemy. By World War II, battlefield mobility had greatly improved with the development of the tank, and with tracked and other mechanized vehicles, to move forces to, from, along and across the battlefront even under fire.

Since the end of World War II, armies have continued to develop their mobility. By the 1980s, for example, intercontinental travel shifted from sea to air transport, enabling military forces to move from one part of the world to another within hours or days instead of weeks.

Mobility has also been referred to as a combat multiplier. A highly-mobile unit can use its mobility to engage multiples of its own combat strength of less mobile units. For example, German panzer divisions in World War II were considered the equivalent of two or three infantry divisions, partly by their superior mobility and partly by their inherently greater firepower.

As intelligence, surveillance, target acquisition, and reconnaissance capabilities are rapidly developing, mobility becomes even more important. In 2016, Chief of Staff of the United States Army Gen. Mark A. Milley stated that "On the future battlefield, if you stay in one place longer than two or three hours, you will be dead... With enemy drones and sensors constantly on the hunt for targets, there won't even be time for four hours' unbroken sleep".

Mobility has also been defined in terms of three generally recognized levels of warfare: tactical, operational, and strategic. Tactical mobility is the ability to move under fire. Operational mobility is the ability to move men and materiel within the area of operations to the decisive point of battle. Strategic mobility is the ability to move an army to the area of operations.

In World War I, most armies lacked tactical mobility but enjoyed good strategic mobility through the use of railroads, thus leading to a situation where armies could be deployed to the front with ease and rapidity, but once they reached the front became bogged down by their inability to move under fire.

== Mobility corridor ==
A mobility corridor is an area where a military force will be canalized (channeled) due to terrain restrictions. It allows forces to capitalize on the principles of mass and speed, and needs to be relatively free of obstacles.

Mobility corridors can be combined to make avenues of approach. Maximum distances between mobility corridors (sizes of avenues of approach) are as follows:

1. Division avenues of approach have regimental mobility corridors no more than 10 kilometers apart.
2. Regimental avenues of approach have battalion mobility corridors no more than 6 kilometers apart.
3. Battalion avenues of approach have company mobility corridors no more than 2 kilometers apart.
4. Company avenues of approach are at least 500 meters wide.

== See also ==
- Choke point
- Schwerpunkt
