= Additive model =

Statistical regression model

In statistics, an additive model (AM) is a nonparametric regression method. It was suggested by Jerome H. Friedman and Werner Stuetzle (1981) and is an essential part of the ACE algorithm. The AM uses a one-dimensional smoother to build a restricted class of nonparametric regression models. Because of this, it is less affected by the curse of dimensionality than a p-dimensional smoother. Furthermore, the AM is more flexible than a standard linear model, while being more interpretable than a general regression surface at the cost of approximation errors. Problems with AM, like many other machine-learning methods, include model selection, overfitting, and multicollinearity.

== Description ==
Given a data set $\{y_i,\, x_{i1}, \ldots, x_{ip}\}_{i=1}^n$ of n statistical units, where $\{x_{i1}, \ldots, x_{ip}\}_{i=1}^n$ represent predictors and $y_i$ is the outcome, the additive model takes the form

$$\mathrm{E}[y_i|x_{i1}, \ldots, x_{ip}] = \beta_0+\sum_{j=1}^p f_j(x_{ij})$$

or

$$Y= \beta_0+\sum_{j=1}^p f_j(X_{j})+\varepsilon$$

Where $\mathrm{E}[ \epsilon ] = 0$, $\mathrm{Var}(\epsilon) = \sigma^2$ and $\mathrm{E}[ f_j(X_{j}) ] = 0$. The functions $f_j(x_{ij})$ are unknown smooth functions fit from the data. Fitting the AM (i.e. the functions $f_j(x_{ij})$) can be done using the backfitting algorithm proposed by Andreas Buja, Trevor Hastie and Robert Tibshirani (1989).

== See also ==
- Generalized additive model
- Backfitting algorithm
- Projection pursuit regression
- Generalized additive model for location, scale, and shape (GAMLSS)
- Median polish
- Projection pursuit
