= Tukey's test of additivity =

Concept in statistics

In statistics, Tukey's test of additivity, named for John Tukey, is an approach used in two-way ANOVA (regression analysis involving two qualitative factors) to assess whether the factor variables (categorical variables) are additively related to the expected value of the response variable. It can be applied when there are no replicated values in the data set, a situation in which it is impossible to directly estimate a fully general non-additive regression structure and still have information left to estimate the error variance. The test statistic proposed by Tukey has one degree of freedom under the null hypothesis, hence this is often called "Tukey's one-degree-of-freedom test."

== Introduction ==
The most common setting for Tukey's test of additivity is a two-way factorial analysis of variance (ANOVA) with one observation per cell. The response variable Y_{ij} is observed in a table of cells with the rows indexed by i = 1,..., m and the columns indexed by j = 1,..., n. The rows and columns typically correspond to various types and levels of treatment that are applied in combination.

The additive model states that the expected response can be expressed EY_{ij} = μ + α_{i} + β_{j}, where the α_{i} and β_{j} are unknown constant values. The unknown model parameters are usually estimated as

$$\widehat{\mu} = \bar{Y}_{\cdot\cdot}$$

$$\widehat{\alpha}_i = \bar{Y}_{i\cdot} - \bar{Y}_{\cdot\cdot}$$

$$\widehat{\beta}_j = \bar{Y}_{\cdot j} - \bar{Y}_{\cdot\cdot}$$

where Y̅_{i•} is the mean of the i^{th} row of the data table, Y̅_{•j} is the mean of the j^{th} column of the data table, and Y̅_{••} is the overall mean of the data table.

The additive model can be generalized to allow for arbitrary interaction effects by setting EY_{ij} = μ + α_{i} + β_{j} + γ_{ij}. However, after fitting the natural estimator of γ_{ij},

$$\widehat{\gamma}_{ij} = Y_{ij} - (\widehat{\mu} + \widehat{\alpha}_i + \widehat{\beta}_j),$$

the fitted values

$$\widehat{Y}_{ij} = \widehat{\mu} + \widehat{\alpha}_i + \widehat{\beta}_j + \widehat{\gamma}_{ij} \equiv Y_{ij}$$

fit the data exactly. Thus there are no remaining degrees of freedom to estimate the variance σ^{2}, and no hypothesis tests about the γ_{ij} can performed.

Tukey therefore proposed a more constrained interaction model of the form

$$\operatorname{E} Y_{ij} = \mu + \alpha_i + \beta_j + \lambda\alpha_i\beta_j$$

By testing the null hypothesis that λ = 0, we are able to detect some departures from additivity based only on the single parameter λ.

== Method ==
To carry out Tukey's test, set

$$SS_A \equiv n \sum_{i} (\bar{Y}_{i \cdot}-\bar{Y}_{\cdot\cdot})^2$$

$$SS_B \equiv m \sum_{j} (\bar{Y}_{\cdot j} - \bar{Y}_{\cdot\cdot})^2$$

$$SS_{AB} \equiv \frac{(\sum_{ij} Y_{ij}(\bar{Y}_{i\cdot}-\bar{Y}_{\cdot\cdot})(\bar{Y}_{\cdot j}-\bar{Y}_{\cdot\cdot}))^2}{\sum_{i} (\bar{Y}_{i \cdot}-\bar{Y}_{\cdot\cdot})^2  \sum_{j} (\bar{Y}_{\cdot j} - \bar{Y}_{\cdot\cdot})^2}$$

$$SS_T \equiv \sum_{ij} (Y_{i j} - \bar{Y}_{\cdot\cdot})^2$$

$$SS_E \equiv SS_T - SS_A - SS_B - SS_{AB}$$

Then use the following test statistic

$$\frac{SS_{AB}/1}{MS_E}.$$

Under the null hypothesis, the test statistic has an F distribution with 1, q degrees of freedom, where q = mn − (m + n) is the degrees of freedom for estimating the error variance.

== See also ==
- Tukey's range test for multiple comparisons
