= Time domain =

Analysis of math functions with respect to time

In mathematics and signal processing, the time domain is a representation of how a signal, function, or data set varies with time. It is used for the analysis of mathematical functions, physical signals or time series of economic or environmental data.

In the time domain, the independent variable is time, and the dependent variable is the value of the signal. This contrasts with the frequency domain, where the signal is represented by its constituent frequencies. For continuous-time signals, the value of the signal is defined for all real numbers representing time. For discrete-time signals, the value is known at discrete, often equally-spaced, time intervals. It is commonly visualized using a graph where the x-axis represents time and the y-axis represents the signal's value. An oscilloscope is a common tool used to visualize real-world signals in the time domain.

Though most precisely referring to time in physics, the term time domain may occasionally informally refer to position in space when dealing with spatial frequencies, as a substitute for the more precise term spatial domain.

The Fourier transform relates the function in the time domain, shown in red, to the function in the frequency domain, shown in blue. The component frequencies, spread across the frequency spectrum, are represented as peaks in the frequency domain.

== Origin of term ==
The use of the contrasting terms time domain and frequency domain developed in U.S. communication engineering in the late 1940s, with the terms appearing together without definition by 1950. When an analysis uses the second or one of its multiples as a unit of measurement, then it is in the time domain. When analysis concerns the reciprocal units such as Hertz, then it is in the frequency domain.

== See also ==
- Frequency domain
- Fourier transform
- Laplace transform
- Blackman–Tukey transform
