= Ralph Beebe Blackman =

American mathematician and engineer

- Born: August 29, 1904
- Died: May 24, 1990 (aged 85)
- Education: Caltech
- Known for: Blackman window Blackman's theorem Blackman–Tukey transformation
- Scientific career
- Fields: Applied mathematics
- Workplaces: Bell Laboratories

Ralph Beebe Blackman (August 29, 1904 – May 24, 1990) was an American mathematician and engineer who was among the pioneers of the Information Age along with Claude E. Shannon, Hendrik Wade Bode, and John Tukey.

Blackman graduated from the California Institute of Technology in 1926 and started work at Bell Laboratories the same year. His early research were in the fields of hearing, acoustics and mechanical filters. Later he focused on applied mathematics, specifically linear networks and feedback amplifiers. Starting in 1940, Blackman worked on data smoothing for anti-aircraft fire control systems.

In 1963 Blackman was elected an IEEE Fellow.

== Books ==
- Blackman, R. B.; Tukey, J. W. (1958). The Measurement Of Power Spectra: From The Point Of View Of Communications Engineering. New York: Dover Publications. p. 190. ISBN 978-1258425180.
- Blackman, R. B. (1965). Linear data-smoothing and prediction in theory and practice. Reading, Massachusetts: Addison-Wesley. p. 182. ISBN 978-0201006100.

== Patents ==
- A US patent 3271565 A, Ralph B. Blackman, "System for determining the orbital parameters of a terrestrial satellite", published 6 September 1966, assigned to Bell Telephone Laboratories Inc.
- A US patent 2950863 A, Ralph B. Blackman, "Apparatus for the solution of plane triangles", published 30 August 1960, assigned to Bell Telephone Laboratories Inc.
- A US patent 2710720 A, Ralph B. Blackman, "Artillery computer", published 14 June 1955, assigned to Bell Telephone Laboratories Inc.
- A US patent 2476269 A, Ralph B. Blackman, "Mechanical differentiator for smoothing target tracking data", published 19 July 1949, assigned to Bell Telephone Laboratories Inc.
- A US patent 2270644 A, Ralph B. Blackman, "Negative impedance circuits", published 20 January 1942, assigned to Bell Telephone Laboratories Inc.
- A US patent 2231404 A, Ralph B. Blackman, "Electromechanical wave filter", published 11 February 1941, assigned to Bell Telephone Laboratories Inc.
- A US patent 2139220 A, Ralph B. Blackman & Emory Lakatos, "Electromechanical wave filter", published 6 December 1938, assigned to Bell Telephone Laboratories Inc.
- A US patent 2091250 A, Ralph B. Blackman, "Wave filter", published 31 August 1937, assigned to Bell Telephone Laboratories Inc.
- A US patent 2086597 A, Ralph B. Blackman, "Wave filter", published 13 July 1937, assigned to Bell Telephone Laboratories Inc.
