= Tukey–Duckworth test =

Statistical test

In statistics, the Tukey–Duckworth test is a two-sample location test – a statistical test of whether one of two samples was significantly greater than the other. It was introduced by John Tukey, who aimed to answer a request by W. E. Duckworth for a test simple enough to be remembered and applied in the field without recourse to tables, let alone computers.

Given two groups of measurements of roughly the same size, where one group contains the highest value and the other the lowest value, then (i) count the number of values in the one group exceeding all values in the other, (ii) count the number of values in the other group falling below all those in the one, and (iii) sum these two counts (we require that neither count be zero). The critical values of the total count are, roughly, 7, 10, and 13, i.e. 7 for a two sided 5% level, 10 for a two sided 1% level, and 13 for a two sided 0.1% level.

The test loses some accuracy if the samples are quite large (greater than 30) or much different in size (ratio more than 4:3). Tukey's paper describes adjustments for these conditions.
