= Ridge function =

In mathematics, a ridge function is any function $f:\R^d\rightarrow\R$ that can be written as the composition of an univariate function $g:\R \rightarrow\R$, that is called a profile function, with an affine transformation, given by a direction vector $a \in \R^d$ with shift $b \in \R$.

Then, the ridge function reads $f(x) = g(x^{\top} a + b )$ for $x\in\R^d$.

Coinage of the term 'ridge function' is often attributed to B.F. Logan and L.A. Shepp.

== Relevance ==
A ridge function is not susceptible to the curse of dimensionality, making it an instrumental tool in various estimation problems. This is a direct result of the fact that ridge functions are constant in $d-1$ directions: Let $a_1,\dots,a_{d-1}$ be $d-1$ independent vectors that are orthogonal to $a$, such that these vectors span $d-1$ dimensions. Then

$$f\left(\boldsymbol{x} + \sum_{k=1}^{d-1}c_k\boldsymbol{a}_k\right)=g\left(\boldsymbol{x}\cdot\boldsymbol{a} + \sum_{k=1}^{d-1} c_k\boldsymbol{a}_k\cdot\boldsymbol{a}\right)=g\left(\boldsymbol{x}\cdot\boldsymbol{a} + \sum_{k=1}^{d-1} c_k0\right) = g(\boldsymbol{x} \cdot \boldsymbol{a})=f(\boldsymbol{x})$$

for all $c_i\in\R,1\le i<d$. In other words, any shift of $\boldsymbol{x}$ in a direction perpendicular to $\boldsymbol{a}$ does not change the value of $f$.

Ridge functions play an essential role in amongst others projection pursuit, generalized linear models, and as activation functions in neural networks. For a survey on ridge functions, see. For books on ridge functions, see.
