= James Cooley =

American mathematician

- Born: September 18, 1926
- Died: June 29, 2016 (aged 89)
- Education: Manhattan College; Columbia University
- Known for: Blackman–Tukey transformation Cooley–Tukey FFT algorithm
- Awards: IEEE Centennial Medal
- Scientific career
- Fields: mathematics computer engineering
- Workplaces: Institute for Advanced Study; Courant Institute; IBM Watson Research Center; University of Rhode Island

James William Cooley (September 18, 1926 – June 29, 2016) was an American mathematician. Cooley received a B.A. degree in 1949 from Manhattan College, Bronx, New York, an M.A. degree in 1951 from Columbia University, New York City, and a Ph.D. degree in 1961 in applied mathematics from Columbia University. He was a programmer on John von Neumann's computer at the Institute for Advanced Study, Princeton, New Jersey, from 1953 to 1956, where he notably programmed the Blackman–Tukey transformation.

He worked on quantum mechanical computations at the Courant Institute, New York University, from 1956 to 1962, when he joined the Research Staff at the IBM Watson Research Center, Yorktown Heights, New York. Upon retirement from IBM in 1991, he joined the Department of Electrical Engineering at the University of Rhode Island, Kingston, where he served on the faculty of the computer engineering program.

His most significant contribution to the world of mathematics and digital signal processing is re-discovering the fast Fourier transform, which he co-developed with John Tukey (see Cooley–Tukey FFT algorithm) while working for the research division of IBM in 1965.

The motivation for it was provided by Dr. Richard L. Garwin at IBM Watson Research who was concerned about verifying a nuclear arms treaty with the Soviet Union for the SALT talks. Garwin thought that if he had a very much faster Fourier Transform he could plant sensors in the ground in countries surrounding the Soviet Union. He suggested to both Cooley and Tukey how Fourier transforms could be programmed to be much faster. They did the work, the sensors were planted, and he was able to locate nuclear explosions to within 15 kilometers of where they were occurring.

J. W. Cooley was a member of the Digital Signal Processing Committee of the IEEE, was elected a Fellow of IEEE for his work on the FFT, and received the IEEE Centennial Medal. In 2002 he received the IEEE Jack S. Kilby Signal Processing Medal. He considerably contributed to the establishing of terminology in digital signal processing.

== Publications ==
- James W. Cooley (1961): "An improved eigenvalue corrector formula for solving the Schrödinger equation for central fields", Math. Comput. 15, 363–374. doi:10.1090/S0025-5718-1961-0129566-X This describes the so-called Numerov-Cooley method for numerically solving one-dimensional Schrödinger equations.
- James W. Cooley & John W. Tukey (1965): "An algorithm for the machine calculation of complex Fourier series", Math. Comput. 19, 297–301.
- Cooley, James W., Timothy M. Toolan and Donald W. Tufts. "A Subspace Tracking Algorithm Using the Fast Fourier Transform." IEEE Signal Processing Letters. 11(1):30–32. January 2004.
- Real, Edward C., Donald W. Tufts and James W. Cooley. "Two Algorithms for Fast Approximate Subspace Tracking." IEEE Transactions on Signal Processing. 47(7):1936–1945. July 1999.
- Tufts, D. W., E. C. Real and J. W. Cooley. "Fast Approximate Subspace Tracking (FAST)." IN: Proceedings of the 1997 IEEE International Conference on Acoustics, Speech, and Signal Processing. IEEE. 1997. I:547–550.

== See also ==
- List of pioneers in computer science
