= Blackman–Tukey transformation =

The Blackman–Tukey transformation (or Blackman–Tukey method) is a digital signal processing method to transform data from the time domain to the frequency domain. It was originally programmed around 1953 by James Cooley for John Tukey at John von Neumann's Institute for Advanced Study as a way to get "good smoothed statistical estimates of power spectra without requiring large Fourier transforms." It was published by Ralph Beebe Blackman and John Tukey in 1958.

== Background ==
=== Transformation ===
In signal processing, transformation from the time domain to another domain, such as the frequency domain, is used to focus on the details of a waveform. Many of the waveform's details can be analyzed much more easily in a domain other than the original. Different methods exist to do transformation from time domain to frequency domain; the most prominent is the Fourier transform, which the Blackman–Tukey method uses. Prior to the advent of fast computers and the 1965 rediscovery of the fast Fourier transform, the large number of computations necessary for the discrete Fourier Transform motivated researchers to reduce the number of calculations required, resulting in the (now obsolete) Blackman–Tukey method based on the Wiener–Khinchin theorem.

=== Statistical estimation ===
Statistical estimation is used to determine the expected value(s) of statistical expected values of statistical quantities. Statistical estimation also tries to find the expected values. The expected values are those values that we expect among the random values, derived from samples of the population in probability (group of subset). In time series analysis, discrete data obtained as a function of time is usually the only type of data available, instead of samples of population or group of subsets taken simultaneously.

Difficulty is commonly avoided using an ergodic process, that changes with time and probability gets involved with it, and it's not always periodic at all portions of time.

== Blackman–Tukey transformation method ==
The method is fully described in Blackman and Tukey's 1958 journal publications republished as their 1959 book "The measurement of power spectra, from the point of view of communications engineering" and is outlined by the following procedures:

1. Calculate the autocorrelation function with the data
2. Apply a suitable window function, and finally
3. Compute a discrete Fourier transform (now done with FFT) of the data to obtain the power density spectrum

Autocorrelation makes the wave smoothed rather than averaging several waveforms. This function is set to window, the corresponding waveform toward its extremes. Computation gets faster if more data is correlated and if memory capacity of the system increases then overlap save sectioning technique would be applied. If the autocorrelation function in Blackman–Tukey is computed using FFT, then it will name fast correlation method for spectral estimation.
