= Configural frequency analysis =

Method of exploratory data analysis

Configural frequency analysis (CFA) is a method of exploratory data analysis, introduced by Gustav A. Lienert in 1969. The goal of a configural frequency analysis is to detect patterns in the data that occur significantly more (such patterns are called Types) or significantly less often (such patterns are called Antitypes) than expected by chance. Thus, the idea of a CFA is to provide the identified types and antitypes some insight into the structure of the data. Types are interpreted as concepts which are constituted by a pattern of variable values. Antitypes are interpreted as patterns of variable values that do not in general occur together.

== Basic idea of the CFA algorithm ==
We explain the basic idea of CFA by a simple example. Assume that we have a data set that describes for each of n patients if they show certain symptoms s_{1}, ..., s_{m}. We assume for simplicity that a symptom is shown or not, i.e. we have a dichotomous data set.

Each record in the data set is thus an m-tuple (x_{1}, ..., x_{m}) where each x_{i} is either equal to 0 (patient does not show symptom i) or 1 (patient does show symptom i). Each such m-tuple is called a configuration. Let C be the set of all possible configurations, i.e. the set of all possible m-tuples on {0,1}^{m}. The data set can thus be described by listing the observed frequencies f(c) of all possible configurations in C.

The basic idea of CFA is to estimate the frequency of each configuration under the assumption that the m symptoms are statistically independent. Let e(c) be this estimated frequency under the assumption of independence.

Let p_{i}(1) be the probability that a member of the investigated population shows symptom s_{i} and p_{i}(0) be the probability that a member of the investigated population does not show symptom s_{i}. Under the assumption that all symptoms are independent we can calculate the expected relative frequency of a configuration c = (c_{1} , ..., c_{m}) by:

$$e(c) = n \prod_{i=1}^m p_i(c_i) .$$

Now f(c) and e(c) can be compared by a statistical test (typical tests applied in CFA are Pearson's chi-squared test, the binomial test or the hypergeometric test of Lehmacher).

If the statistical test suggests for a given $\alpha$-level that the difference between f(c) and e(c) is significant then c is called a type if f(c) > e(c) and is called an antitype if f(c) < e(c). If there is no significant difference between f(c) and e(c), then c is neither a type nor an antitype. Thus, each configuration c can have in principle three different states. It can be a type, an antitype, or not classified.

Types and antitypes are defined symmetrically. But in practical applications researchers are mainly interested to detect types. For example, clinical studies are typically interested to detect symptom combinations that are indicators for a disease. These are by definition symptom combinations which occur more often than expected by chance, i.e. types.

== Control of the alpha level ==
Since in CFA a significance test is applied in parallel for each configuration c there is a high risk to commit a type I error (i.e. to detect a type or antitype when the null hypothesis is true). The currently most popular method to control this is to use the Bonferroni correction for the α-level. There are a number of alternative methods to control the α-level. One alternative, the Holm–Bonferroni method introduced by Sture Holm, considers the number of tests already finished when the ith test is performed. Thus, in this method the alpha–level is not constant for all tests.

== Algorithm in the non-dichotomous case ==
In our example above we assumed for simplicity that the symptoms are dichotomous. This is however not a necessary restriction. CFA can also be applied for symptoms (or more general attributes of an object) that are not dichotomous but have a finite number of degrees. In this case a configuration is an element of C = S_{1} x ... x S_{m}, where S_{i} is the set of the possible degrees for symptom s_{i}.

== Chance model ==
The assumption of the independence of the symptoms can be replaced by another method to calculate the expected frequencies e(c) of the configurations. Such a method is called a chance model.

In most applications of CFA the assumption that all symptoms are independent is used as the chance model. A CFA using that chance model is called first-order CFA. This is the classical method of CFA that is in many publications even considered to be the only CFA method. An example of an alternative chance model is the assumption that all configurations have the same probability. A CFA using that chance model is called zero-order CFA.
