= John Tukey =

American mathematician (1915–2000)

- Born: June 16, 1915; New Bedford, Massachusetts, U.S.
- Died: July 26, 2000 (aged 85); New Brunswick, New Jersey, U.S.
- Education: Brown University (BA, MS); Princeton University (PhD)
- Known for: Exploratory data analysis; Multiple comparisons problem; Projection pursuit; Box plot; Blackman–Tukey transformation; Cooley–Tukey FFT algorithm; Freeman–Tukey transformation; Siegel–Tukey test; Stone–Tukey theorem; Tukey–Duckworth test; Tukey's range test; Tukey lambda distribution; Tukey's trimean; Tukey's test of additivity; Tukey's lemma; Tukey mean difference plot; Tukey median; Tukey depth; Tukey's biweight function; Tukey's fences; Tukey window; Cepstrum; Flexagon; Median polish; Midhinge; Slash distribution; Theory of conjoint measurement; Coining the term 'bit'; Scagnostics
- Awards: Wilks Memorial Award (1965); National Medal of Science (1973); Shewhart Medal (1976); IEEE Medal of Honor (1982); Deming Medal (1982); Foreign Member of the Royal Society (1991)
- Scientific career
- Fields: Topology
- Workplaces: Bell Labs; Princeton University
- Thesis: On Denumerability in Topology
- Doctoral advisor: Solomon Lefschetz
- Doctoral students: David R. Brillinger; Kai Lai Chung; Arthur Dempster; Leo Goodman; Karen Kafadar; Thomas E. Kurtz; Paul Meier; Frederick Mosteller; John A. Hartigan

John Wilder Tukey (/ˈtuːki/; June 16, 1915 – July 26, 2000) was an American mathematician and statistician, best known for the development of the fast Fourier Transform (FFT) algorithm, the box plot and for laying the foundations of the field of exploratory data analysis. The Tukey range test, the Tukey lambda distribution, the Tukey test of additivity, and the Teichmüller–Tukey lemma all bear his name. He is also credited with coining the term bit and the first published use of the word software.

== Biography ==
Tukey was born in New Bedford, Massachusetts, in 1915, to a Latin teacher father and a private tutor. He was mainly taught by his mother and attended regular classes only for certain subjects like French. Tukey obtained a B.A. in 1936 and M.S. in 1937 in chemistry, from Brown University, before moving to Princeton University, where in 1939 he received a PhD in mathematics after completing a doctoral dissertation titled "On denumerability in topology".

During World War II, Tukey worked at the Fire Control Research Office and collaborated with Samuel Wilks and William Cochran. After the war, he returned to Princeton, dividing his time between the university and AT&T Bell Laboratories. In 1962, Tukey was elected to the American Philosophical Society. He became a full professor at 35 and founding chairman of the Princeton statistics department in 1965.

Tukey married Elizabeth Rapp, a Temple University graduate who took graduate courses at Radcliffe College and worked as a personnel director for the Educational Testing Service, in 1950. Tukey's sister-in-law Phyllis married the English statistician Frank Anscombe.

Tukey retired in 1985. He died in New Brunswick, New Jersey, on July 26, 2000.

== Scientific contributions ==
Early in his career Tukey worked on developing statistical methods for computers at Bell Labs, where he coined the word bit in 1947.

His statistical interests were many and varied. He is particularly remembered for his development with James Cooley of the Cooley–Tukey FFT algorithm. In 1970, he contributed significantly to what is today known as the jackknife—also termed Quenouille–Tukey jackknife. He introduced the box plot in his 1977 book, "Exploratory Data Analysis", building on the earlier work of Mary Eleanor Spear.

Tukey's range test, the Tukey lambda distribution, Tukey's test of additivity, Tukey's lemma, and the Tukey window all bear his name. He is also the creator of several little-known methods such as the trimean and median-median line, an easier alternative to linear regression.

In 1974, he developed, with Jerome H. Friedman, the concept of the projection pursuit.

=== Accolades ===
Tukey was awarded the National Medal of Science by President Nixon in 1973. He was awarded the IEEE Medal of Honor in 1982 "For his contributions to the spectral analysis of random processes and the fast Fourier transform (FFT) algorithm".

=== Data analysis and foundations of data science ===
John Tukey contributed greatly to statistical practice and data analysis in general. In fact, some regard John Tukey as the father of data science. At the very least, he pioneered many of the key foundations of what came later to be known as data science.

Making sense of data has a long history and has been addressed by statisticians, mathematicians, scientists, and others for many many years. During the 1960s, Tukey challenged the dominance at the time of what he called "confirmatory data analysis", statistical analyses driven by rigid mathematical configurations. Tukey emphasized the importance of having a more flexible attitude towards data analysis and of exploring data carefully to see what structures and information might be contained therein. He called this "exploratory data analysis" (EDA). In many ways, EDA was a precursor to data science.

Tukey also realized the importance of computer science to EDA. Graphics are an integral part of EDA methodology and, while much of Tukey's work focused on static displays (such as box plots) that could be drawn by hand, he realized that computer graphics would be much more effective for studying multivariate data. PRIM-9, the first program for viewing multivariate data, was conceived by him during the early 1970s.

This coupling of data analysis and computer science is what is now called data science.

Tukey articulated the important distinction between exploratory data analysis and confirmatory data analysis, believing that much statistical methodology placed too great an emphasis on the latter. Though he believed in the utility of separating the two types of analysis, he pointed out that sometimes, especially in natural science, this was problematic and termed such situations uncomfortable science.

A. D. Gordon of the University of St. Andrews offered the following summary of Tukey's principles for statistical practice:

... the usefulness and limitation of mathematical statistics; the importance of having methods of statistical analysis that are robust to violations of the assumptions underlying their use; the need to amass experience of the behaviour of specific methods of analysis in order to provide guidance on their use; the importance of allowing the possibility of data's influencing the choice of method by which they are analysed; the need for statisticians to reject the role of "guardian of proven truth", and to resist attempts to provide once-for-all solutions and tidy over-unifications of the subject; the iterative nature of data analysis; implications of the increasing power, availability, and cheapness of computing facilities; the training of statisticians.

Tukey's lectures were described to be unusual. McCullagh described his lecture given in London in 1977:

Tukey ambled to the podium, a great bear of a man dressed in baggy pants and a black knitted shirt. These might once have been a matching pair but the vintage was such that it was hard to tell. ... Carefully and deliberately a list of headings was chalked on the blackboard. The words came too, not many, like overweight parcels, delivered at a slow unfaltering pace. ... When it was complete, Tukey turned to face the audience and the podium ... "Comments, queries, suggestions?" he asked the audience ... As he waited for a response, he clambered onto the podium and manoeuvred until he was sitting cross-legged facing the audience. ... We in the audience sat like spectators at the zoo waiting for the great bear to move or say something. But the great bear appeared to be doing the same thing, and the feeling was not comfortable.

== Contributions to other fields ==
Tukey made wide-ranging contributions beyond statistics, once reportedly remarking, "The best thing about being a statistician is that you get to play in everyone's backyard."

In the 1950s, Tukey served on a committee of the National Research Council that produced a report critiquing the statistical methodology of the Kinsey Report, and he chaired a committee in the 1970s on the role of aerosol sprays in damaging the ozone layer.

From 1960 to 1980, Tukey helped design the NBC television network polls used to predict and analyze elections. He was also a consultant to the Educational Testing Service, the Xerox Corporation, and Merck & Company.

During the 1970s and early 1980s, Tukey played a key role in the design and conduct of the National Assessment of Educational Progress.

=== Coining neologisms ===
While working with John von Neumann on early computer designs, Tukey introduced the word bit as a portmanteau of binary digit. The term bit was first used in an article by Claude Shannon in 1948.

Tukey is also credited with the first use of the word software to describe computer programs in a 1958 article in American Mathematical Monthly.

== See also ==
- List of pioneers in computer science

== Books ==
- Tukey, John W. (1977). Exploratory Data Analysis. Pearson. ISBN 978-0-201-07616-5.
- Tukey, John W. (1991) Visual Display of Quantitative Phenomena ASIN B00EB04I6C
- Tukey, John W. (1982) Understanding Robust and Exploratory Data Analysis Wiley, ISBN 0471097772
- Tukey, John W. (1991) Configural Polysampling Wiley, ISBN 0471523720
- Basford, K. and Tukey J. (1998) Graphical Analysis of Multi-response Data, CRC ISBN 0412818906

== Publications ==
- Andrews, David F.; Bickel, Peter J.; Hampel, Frank R.; Huber, Peter J.; Rogers, W. H.; Tukey, John Wilder (1972). Robust estimates of location: survey and advances. Princeton University Press. ISBN 978-0-691-08113-7. OCLC 369963.
- Basford, Kaye E.; Tukey, John Wilder (1998). Graphical Analysis of Multiresponse Data. Chapman & Hall/CRC Press. ISBN 978-0-8493-0384-5. OCLC 154674707.
- Blackman, R. B.; Tukey, John Wilder (1959). The measurement of power spectra from the point of view of communications engineering. Dover Publications. ISBN 978-0-486-60507-4.
- Cochran, William Gemmell; Mosteller, Charles Frederick; Tukey, John Wilder (1953). Statistical problems of the Kinsey report on sexual behavior in the human male. Journal of the American Statistical Association. doi:10.1080/01621459.1953.10501194.
- Cooley, James W.; Tukey, John W. (1965). "An algorithm for the machine calculation of complex Fourier series". Math. Comput. 19 (90): 297–301. doi:10.2307/2003354. JSTOR 2003354.* Hoaglin, David C.; Mosteller, Charles Frederick; Tukey, John Wilder, eds. (1983). Understanding Robust and Exploratory Data Analysis. Wiley. ISBN 978-0-471-09777-8. OCLC 8495063.
- Hoaglin, David C.; Mosteller, Charles Frederick; Tukey, John Wilder, eds. (1985). Exploring Data Tables, Trends and Shapes. Wiley. ISBN 978-0-471-09776-1. OCLC 11550398.
- Hoaglin, David C.; Mosteller, Charles Frederick; Tukey, John Wilder, eds. (1991). Fundamentals of exploratory analysis of variance. Wiley. ISBN 978-0-471-52735-0. OCLC 23180322.
- Morgenthaler, Stephan; Tukey, John Wilder, eds. (1991). Configural polysampling: a route to practical robustness. Wiley. ISBN 978-0-471-52372-7. OCLC 22381036.
- Mosteller, Charles Frederick; Tukey, John Wilder (1977). Data analysis and regression: a second course in statistics. Addison-Wesley. ISBN 978-0-201-04854-4. OCLC 3235470.
- Tukey, John Wilder (1940). Convergence and Uniformity in Topology. Princeton University Press. OCLC 227948615. ISBN 978-0-691-09568-4.
- Tukey, John Wilder (1977). Exploratory Data Analysis. Addison-Wesley. ISBN 978-0-201-07616-5. OCLC 3058187.
- Tukey, John Wilder; Ross, Ian C.; Bertrand, Verna (1973). Index to statistics and probability. R & D Press. ISBN 978-0-88274-001-0. OCLC 745715.

The collected works of John W Tukey, edited by William S. Cleveland

- Brillinger, David R., ed. (1984). Volume I: Time series, 1949–1964. Wadsworth, Inc. ISBN 978-0-534-03303-3. OCLC 10998116.
- Brillinger, David R., ed. (1985). Volume II: Time series, 1965–1984. Wadsworth, Inc. ISBN 978-0-534-03304-0. OCLC 159731367.
- Jones, Lyle V., ed. (1985). Volume III: Philosophy and principles of data analysis, 1949–1964. Wadsworth & Brooks/Cole. ISBN 978-0-534-03305-7. OCLC 159731367.
- Jones, Lyle V., ed. (1986). Volume IV: Philosophy and principles of data analysis, 1965–1986. Wadsworth & Brooks/Cole. ISBN 978-0-534-05101-3. OCLC 165832503.
- Cleveland, William S., ed. (1988). Volume V: Graphics, 1965–1985. Wadsworth & Brooks/Cole. ISBN 978-0-534-05102-0. OCLC 230023465.
- Mallows, Colin L., ed. (1990). Volume VI: More mathematical, 1938–1984. Wadsworth & Brooks/Cole. ISBN 978-0-534-05103-7. OCLC 232966724.
- Cox, David R., ed. (1992). Volume VII: Factorial and ANOVA, 1949–1962. Wadsworth & Brooks/Cole. ISBN 978-0-534-05104-4. OCLC 165366083.
- Braun, Henry I., ed. (1994). Volume VIII: Multiple comparisons, 1949–1983. Chapman & Hall/CRC Press. ISBN 978-0-412-05121-0. OCLC 165099761.

About John Tukey

- O'Connor, John J.; Robertson, Edmund F., "John Tukey", MacTutor History of Mathematics Archive, University of St Andrews
- Interview of John Tukey about his experience at Princeton
- Frederick Mosteller and John W. Tukey: A Conversation moderated by Francis J. Anscombe, Statistical Science Vol. 3, No. 1 (Feb. 1988), pp. 136–144.
