= Generalized additive model for location, scale and shape =

Distributional regression model

The generalized additive model for location, scale and shape (GAMLSS) is a distributional regression model in which a parametric statistical distribution is assumed for the response (target) variable but the parameters of this distribution can vary according to explanatory variables. Therefore the shape of this distribution for the target variable can change with explanatory variables.

GAMLSS is an input output model, i.e. $X \rightarrow Y$ but differs from the classical model in that the input X affects the distribution of the target variable as a whole not just the mean, i.e. $X \rightarrow D(Y|X)$.

GAMLSS allows flexible regression by using smoothing or machine learning techniques to model the parameters of the target variable (response). GAMLSS assumes the response variable could follows any theoretical parametric distribution, which might be heavy or light-tailed, and positively or negatively skewed. In addition, all the parameters of the distribution which often are location (e.g., mean), scale (e.g., variance) and shape (skewness and kurtosis) – can be modelled as linear, nonlinear or using algorithm modelling functions of the explanatory variables. The distributional assumption for the target variables can be checked through diagnostic plots like Q–Q plot or worm plot. GAMLSS is a supervised machine learning model since the target value (the output) is always present.

== Overview of the model ==
The generalized additive model for location, scale and shape (GAMLSS) is a statistical model introduced by Rigby and Stasinopoulos (2005) to overcome some of the limitations associated with the popular generalized linear models (GLMs) of Nelder and Wedderburn (1972) and generalized additive models (GAMs) of Hastie and Tibshirani. Most of the limitations arise from the limited choice of distributions for the response. Both GLM and GAM assumed that the response comes from the exponential family a family rich enough to allow continuous and discrete responses (and very good for modelling the mean of the distribution as a function of the explanatory variables) but not very flexible enough to model other characteristics of the distribution, i.e, tails.

In GAMLSS the exponential family distribution assumption for the response variable, ($y$), (essential in GLMs and GAMs), is relaxed and replaced by a general distribution family, including highly skew and/or kurtotic continuous and discrete distributions.

The systematic part of the model is expanded to allow modelling not only of the mean (or location) but possibly other parameters of the distribution of response as linear and/or nonlinear, parametric and/or additive non-parametric functions of explanatory variables and/or random effects.

GAMLSS, for continuous responses, is especially suited for modelling a leptokurtic or platykurtic and/or positively or negatively skewed variables therefore modelling the tails of the distribution. For count type response variable data it deals with over-dispersion and zero-inflation by using proper over-dispersed and zero inflated distributions. Heterogeneity also is dealt with by modeling the scale or shape parameters using explanatory variables. GAMLSS allow also mixed distributions, that is, distributions which have discrete and continuous parts, i.e the zero inflated beta is one of them. Note that while the beta distribution allow value in $(0,1)$ the beta inflated allows values in $[0,1]$.

There are several packages written in R related to GAMLSS models, and tutorials for using and interpreting GAMLSS.

A GAMLSS model assumes independent observations $y_i$ for $i = 1, 2, \dots , n$ with conditional probability density function $D (y_i | \boldsymbol{\theta}_i )$, where $\boldsymbol{\theta}_i = (\theta_{1i}, \ldots, \theta_{Ki})$ contains the $K$ distribution parameters for observation $i$. The parameter $\boldsymbol{\theta}_i$ often is a vector of four distribution parameters, $\boldsymbol{\theta}_i= (\mu_i, \sigma_i, \nu_i, \tau_i)$ each of which can be a function of the explanatory variables, for example, $\sigma=g(x)$. The first two distribution parameters $\mu_i$ and $\sigma_i$ are usually characterised as location and scale parameters, while the remaining parameter(s), if any, are characterised as shape parameters, e.g. skewness and kurtosis parameters. The model may be applied more generally to the parameters of any population distribution. The most general formulation of a GAMLSS model is

$$\begin{align}
g_k (\theta_{ki}) &= \eta_{ki} = \operatorname{ML}_k (\boldsymbol{x}_{i}) \,, \qquad k = 1, \ldots, K \,, \quad i = 1, \ldots, n \,.
\end{align}$$

where $\operatorname{ML}_k$ is any machine learning (mathematical or algorithmic) model for the distribution parameter $k$, $K$ is the number of parameters in the distribution for the response, and $\boldsymbol{x}_i$ is the vector of explanatory-variable values for observation $i$. The original formulation of GAMLSS in the 2005 RSS paper had only four parameters and can be written as

$$\begin{align}
g_1 (\boldsymbol{\mu}) = \boldsymbol{\eta}_1= \textbf{X}_1 \boldsymbol{\beta}_1 + \sum_{j=1}^{J_1} {h}_{j1}(\boldsymbol{x}_{j1}) \\
g_2(\boldsymbol{\sigma}) = \boldsymbol{\eta}_2= \textbf{X}_2 \boldsymbol{\beta}_2 + \sum_{j=1}^{J_2}{h}_{j2}(\boldsymbol{x}_{j2}) \\
g_3(\boldsymbol{\nu}) = \boldsymbol{\eta}_3 =  \textbf{X}_3 \boldsymbol{\beta}_3 + \sum_{j=1}^{J_3}{h}_{j3}(\boldsymbol{x}_{j3}) \\
g_4(\boldsymbol{\tau})=\boldsymbol{\eta}_4=\textbf{X}_4 \boldsymbol{\beta}_4 + \sum_{j=1}^{J_4}{h}_{j4}(\boldsymbol{x}_{j4})
\end{align}$$

where $\boldsymbol{\mu}, \boldsymbol{\sigma}, \boldsymbol{\nu}$, $\boldsymbol{\tau}$ and $\boldsymbol{\eta}_k$ are vectors of length $n$, $\boldsymbol{\beta}^{T}_k = (\beta_{1k},\beta_{2k},\ldots,\beta_{J'_{k} k})$ is a parameter vector of length $J'_k$, $\boldsymbol{X}_k$ is a fixed known design matrix of order $n \times J'_k$ and $h_{jk}$ is a smooth non-parametric function of explanatory variable $\boldsymbol{x}_{jk}$, for $j=1,2,\ldots, J_{k}$ and $k=1,2,3,4$. $g_k$ for $k=1,2,3,4$ are link functions to ensure that the parameter are in the correct range of values.

== Applications of the model ==
For centile estimation, the WHO Multicentre Growth Reference Study Group have recommended GAMLSS and the Box–Cox power exponential (BCPE) distributions for the construction of the WHO Child Growth Standards. Recent studies have used GAMLSS to predict the probability of cyanobacterial toxins exceeding critical health thresholds in lakes, as well as in applications related to remote sensing, biogeochemical modeling and medicine.

== What distributions can be used ==
The form of the distribution assumed for the response variable y, is very general. For example, an implementation of GAMLSS in R has around 100 different distributions available. Such implementations also allow use of truncated distributions and censored (or interval) response variables.
