= Median polish =

The median polish is a simple and robust exploratory data analysis procedure proposed by the statistician John Tukey. The purpose of median polish is to find an additively-fit model for data in a two-way layout table (usually, results from a factorial experiment) of the form row effect + column effect + overall median.

Median polish utilizes the medians obtained from the rows and the columns of a two-way table to iteratively calculate the row effect and column effect on the data. The results are not meant to be sensitive to the outliers, as the iterative procedure uses the medians rather than the means.

== Model for a two-way table ==
Suppose an experiment observes the variable Y under the influence of two variables. We can arrange the data in a two-way table in which one variable is constant along the rows and the other variable constant along the columns. Let i and j denote the position of rows and columns (e.g. y_{ij} denotes the value of y at the ith row and the jth column). Then we can obtain a simple linear regression equation:

$$\mathbf{y}_{ij} = b_0 + b_1x_i + b_2z_j + \varepsilon_{ij},$$

where b_{0}, b_{1}, b_{2} are constants, and x_{i} and z_{j} are values associated with rows and columns, respectively.

The equation can be further simplified if no x_{i} and z_{j} values are present for the analysis:

$$\mathbf{y}_{ij} = b_0 + c_i + d_j + \varepsilon_{ij},$$

where c_{i} and d_{j} denote row effects and column effects, respectively.

== Procedure ==
To carry out median polish:

(1) find the row medians for each row, find the median of the row medians, record this as the overall effect.

(2) subtract each element in a row by its row median, do this for all rows.

(3) subtract the overall effect from each row median.

(4) do the same for each column, and add the overall effect from column operations to the overall effect generated from row operations.

(5) repeat (1)-(4) until negligible change occur with row or column medians
