= Jerome H. Friedman =

American mathematician

- Born: December 29, 1939 (age 86); Yreka, California, US
- Education: Chico State College; University of California, Berkeley
- Known for: Projection pursuit regression Gradient boosting CART
- Scientific career
- Fields: Statistics; Machine Learning
- Institutions: Stanford Linear Accelerator Center; Stanford University
- Doctoral advisor: Ronald R. Ross

Jerome Harold Friedman (born December 29, 1939) is an American statistician, consultant and Professor of Statistics at Stanford University, known for his contributions in the field of statistics and data mining.

== Biography ==
Friedman studied at Chico State College for two years before transferring to the University of California, Berkeley in 1959, where he received his AB in Physics in 1962, and his PhD in High Energy Particle Physics in 1967.

In 1968 he started his academic career as research physicist at the Lawrence Berkeley National Laboratory. In 1972 he started at Stanford University as leader of the Computation Research Group at the Stanford Linear Accelerator Center, where he would participate until 2003. In the year 1976–77 he was a visiting scientist at CERN in Geneva. From 1981 to 1984 he was visiting professor at the University of California, Berkeley. In 1982 he was appointed Professor of Statistics at Stanford University.

In 1984 he was elected as a Fellow of the American Statistical Association. In 2002 he was awarded the SIGKDD Innovation Award by the Association for Computing Machinery (ACM). In 2010 he was elected as a member of the National Academy of Sciences (Applied mathematical sciences).

== Publications ==
Friedman has authored and co-authored many publications in the field of data-mining including "nearest neighbor classification, logistical regressions, and high dimensional data analysis. His primary research interest is in the area of machine learning." A selection:

- Friedman, Jerome H. & Tukey, John W. (1974). "A projection pursuit algorithm for exploratory data analysis". IEEE Transactions on Computers. 23 (9): 881–890. doi:10.1109/T-C.1974.224051. OSTI 1442925. S2CID 7997450.
- Friedman, Jerome H. & Stuetzle, Werner (1981). "Projection pursuit regression". Journal of the American Statistical Association. 76 (376): 817–823. doi:10.1080/01621459.1981.10477729. OSTI 1445517.
- Friedman, Jerome H. (1991). "Multivariate adaptive regression splines". Annals of Statistics. 19 (1): 1–67. CiteSeerX 10.1.1.382.970. doi:10.1214/aos/1176347963. JSTOR 2241837.
- Friedman, Jerome H. (2001). "Greedy function approximation: a gradient boosting machine". Annals of Statistics. 29 (5): 1189–1232. doi:10.1214/aos/1013203451. JSTOR 2699986.

== See also ==
- Gradient boosting
- LogitBoost
- Multivariate adaptive regression splines
- Projection pursuit regression
