= List of R software and tools =

R software and development tools

This is a list of software and programming tools for the R programming language, including IDEs, package managers, libraries, debugging tools, numerical and scientific computing tools, and related projects.

== Integrated development environments (IDEs) and editors ==
- Emacs Speaks Statistics (ESS) — Emacs interface for R and other statistical software
- Jupyter — supports R through IRkernel
- RKWard — KDE/Qt-based IDE and GUI for R
- RStudio — popular cross-platform IDE for R
- Visual Studio Code — supports R via extensions (R Tools for Visual Studio)

== Graphical user interfaces ==
- jamovi — GUI statistical environment built on R for data analysis and performing statistical tests
- Java GUI for R — cross-platform R console, script editor, and spreadsheet/data view.
- Rattle GUI — data mining GUI for R
- R Commander (Rcmdr) — basic GUI for statistics in R, often used for teaching and introductory work.

== Implementations of R ==
- GNU R — main implementation of R, maintained by the R Core Team, and distributed as part of the GNU Project.
- Renjin — JVM-based interpreter for R

== R packages ==
- Bioconductor — repository for bioinformatics and computational biology R packages
- CRAN — Comprehensive R Archive Network, primary repository for R packages.
- Knitr — integration of R code into LaTeX, LyX, HTML, Markdown, AsciiDoc, and reStructuredText documents.
- Tidyverse — Ggplot2, dplyr, and other packages.

== Scientific and statistical libraries ==
- dplyr — data manipulation toolkit
- ggplot2 — data visualization based on the grammar of graphics
- shiny — interactive web applications

== Machine learning and AI libraries ==
- xgboost — gradient boosting framework with R bindings

== See also ==
- Data science
- gretl — open-source software for econometrics that can integrate with R
- List of numerical libraries
- Lists of programming software development tools by language
- Statistical software
