= Jenny Bryan =

Data scientist, developer of R software

Jennifer "Jenny" Bryan
- Occupations: Software engineer at Posit PBC (formerly RStudio PBC); Associate Professor at University of British Columbia
- Known for: R packages

Academic background
- Education: Yale University (B.A.); University of California, Berkeley (PhD)
- Website: https://jennybryan.org

Jennifer "Jenny" Bryan is a data scientist and an associate professor of statistics at the University of British Columbia where she developed the Master in Data Science Program. She is a statistician and software engineer at RStudio from Vancouver, Canada and is known for creating open source tools which connect R to Google Sheets and Google Drive.

== Education ==
Bryan earned her Bachelor of Arts in Economics and German literature from Yale University in 1992 and her PhD in Biostatistics from University of California, Berkeley in 2001.

== Career ==
As an associate professor of statistics at the University of British Columbia, Bryan worked on biostatistics with a focus on gene expression and microarray data. Notable projects to which she has contributed include the quantification of photomotor responses in larval zebrafish, the development of an assay system in the multicellular animal Caenorhabditis elegans to test genetic interactions causing synthetic lethality in somatic cells, and a novel yeast-based model to search for modifier genes involved in cystic fibrosis. Beyond biostatistics, Bryan has also contributed to medoids-based clustering methods. Her general science contributions include a manifesto published in PLOS One on good practices for scientific computing and an introduction to the Git version control system for research data analysis.

Bryan's teaching activities at UBC included development of the Master of Data Science Program and new materials for the STAT 545 course. Under Bryan's direction, the STAT 545 course became notable as an early example of a data science course taught in a statistics program. It is also notable for its focus on teaching using modern R packages, Git and GitHub, its extensive sharing of teaching materials openly online, and its strong emphasis on practical data cleaning, exploration, and visualization skills, rather than algorithms and theory. As of late 2016 Bryan is on leave from her UBC position and is working at RStudio with a team led by Hadley Wickham.

Bryan has had experience with S and R since 1996. She is known for her open source contributions in R. Influential contributions include the use of Lego and the concept of data rectangling for explaining programming concepts, reproducible research, and advice on project and workflow organisation.

Bryan is well known for her work on efficient methods of working in spreadsheets, and the connection between R and spreadsheet software such as Excel and Google Sheets. She is the primary developer of the R package googlesheets, that connects R to the Google Sheets service, and googledrive, an R package for interfacing between R and Google Drive.

Bryan is known for her work in teaching, her contributions to R packages, and her involvement with the leadership committee at rOpenSci. She is also part of the R Foundation's Forwards task force and a member of the editorial board of BMC Bioinformatics. Previously, she worked as an Associate at the Boston Consulting Group in Boston, MA.

== Personal life ==
Bryan lives with her husband, three children, and dog, Toby.
