= Vega and Vega-Lite visualisation grammars =

Graphics software tools

- Vega (top), Vega-Lite (bottom)
- Developer(s): Jeffrey Heer, Arvind Satyanarayan, Dominik Moritz, Kanit Wongsuphasawat, and community
- Initial release: 2 April 2013; 12 years ago
- Stable release: 6.0.0 / 27 March 2025; 3 months ago
- Written in: JavaScript
- Type: Data visualization, JavaScript library
- License: BSD 3-Clause "New" or "Revised" License
- Website: vega.github.io

Vega and Vega-Lite are visualization tools implementing a grammar of graphics, similar to ggplot2. The Vega and Vega-Lite grammars extend Leland Wilkinson's Grammar of Graphics by adding a novel grammar of interactivity to assist in the exploration of complex datasets.

Vega acts as a low-level language suited to explanatory figures (the same use case as D3.js), while Vega-Lite is a higher-level language suited to rapidly exploring data. Vega is used in the backend of several data visualization systems, for example Voyager. Chart specifications are written in JSON and rendered in a browser or exported to either vector or bitmap images. Bindings for Vega-Lite have been written in several programming languages, such as the Python package Altair. The grammars and associated tools are open source projects led by the University of Washington Interactive Data Lab and released under a BSD-3 license.
