= JGR =

JGR can refer to:

- Japanese Government Railways
- Java Gui for R, a user interface in the R programming language
- JGroups, a Java library
- Jet Grind Radio, a video game
- Joe Gibbs Racing, American professional racing organization
- John G. Roberts, Jr. (born 1955), Chief Justice of the United States
- Journal of Geophysical Research, a peer-reviewed scientific journal
- Journal of Genocide Research a peer-reviewed academic journal for genocides
- Jessica González-Rojas (born 1976), New York State Assemblymember for the 34th Assembly District
