= Julia Silge =

American data scientist and software engineer

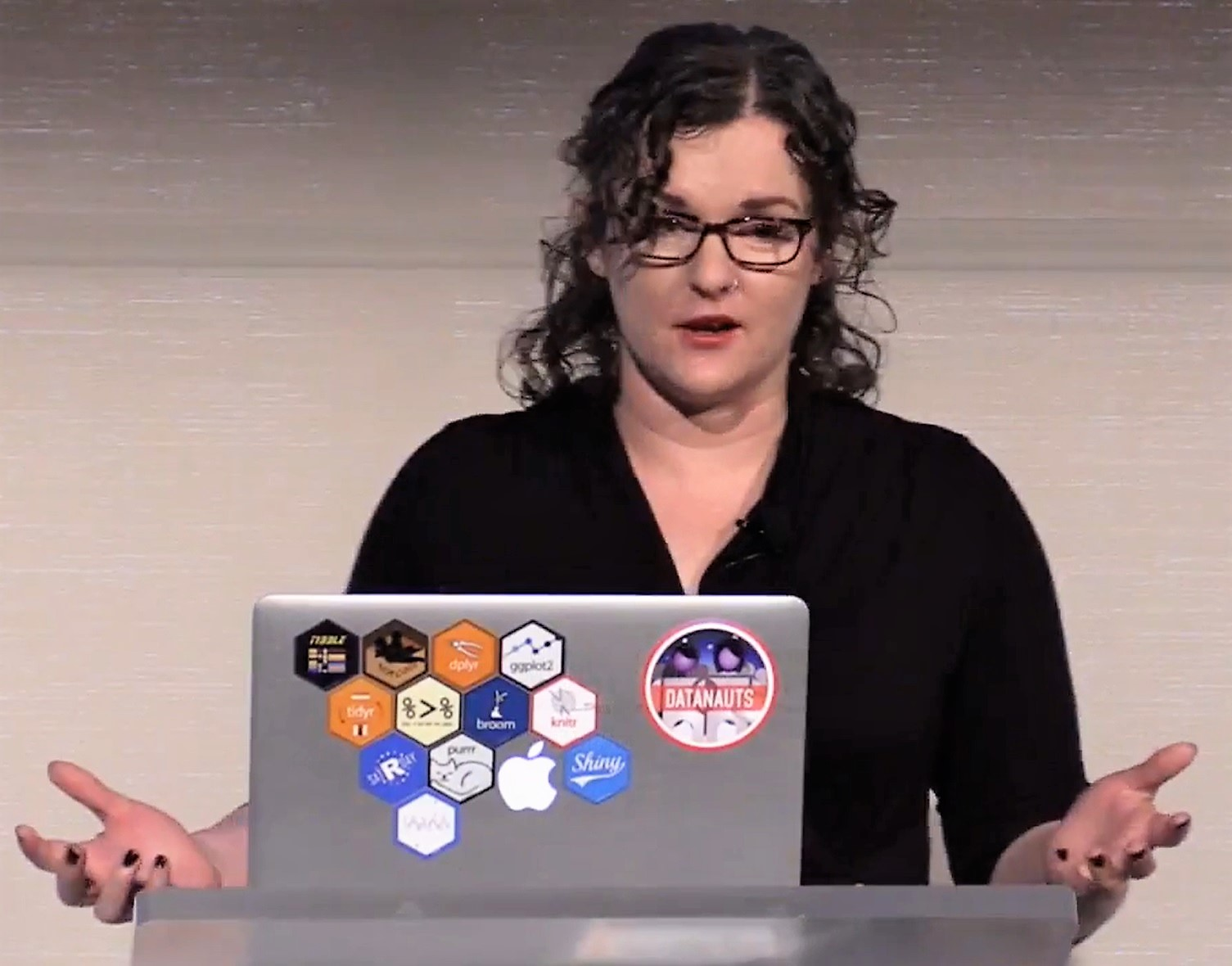
- Silge speaks in 2017
- Born: June 10, 1978 (age 48)
- Education: Texas A&M University; University of Texas at Austin
- Known for: Natural language processing; Machine learning
- Scientific career
- Fields: Data science; R (programming language)
- Workplaces: Stack Overflow; Posit PBC
- Website: juliasilge.com

Julia Silge (born June 10, 1978) is an American data scientist and software engineer. She has developed tools for statistical modelling in the R programming language, including the text mining package tidytext. Silge currently works for Posit PBC, formerly known as RStudio PBC.

== Education and career ==
Silge studied physics at Texas A&M University, graduating in 2000. She obtained her M.A. (2002) and PhD (2005) in astronomy from the University of Texas at Austin. She was an adjunct professor at University of New Haven and Quinnipiac University from 2006 to 2008.

Silge has worked as a data scientist for several companies, most recently Stack Overflow and Posit PBC. At Stack Overflow, she researched the popularity of different programming languages and skills for technologists. She also began working on tidytext, an R package for text mining, with colleague David Robinson. Their book Text Mining with R: A Tidy Approach (2017) drew on examples of text analysis ranging from Jane Austen novels, popular songs, NASA metadata, and Twitter archives.

In February 2017, Silge made the news when she used a note attached to a pizza delivery to contact her senator Orrin Hatch to object to the nomination of Betsy DeVos as Secretary of Education, after failing to reach Hatch by phone.

== Selected publications ==
- Silge, Julia; Robinson, David (2017). Text mining with R : A tidy approach (First ed.). O'Reilly. ISBN 978-0367554194. OCLC 993582128.
- Silge, Julia; Hvitfeldt, Emil (2021). Supervised Machine Learning for Text Analysis in R (First ed.). CRC Press. ISBN 9781491981658.
