= Bibliometrix =

R package

bibliometrix
- Original authors: Massimo Aria, Corrado Cuccurullo
- Release: 2017
- Stable release: 4.0.1 / 2022-09-16
- Written in: R
- License: GNU General Public License version 3
- Website: www.bibliometrix.org
- Repository: cran.r-project.org/web/packages/bibliometrix/index.html

Bibliometrix is a package for the R statistical programming language for quantitative research in scientometrics and bibliometrics.

Bibliometrics is the application of quantitative analysis and statistics to publications such as journal articles and their accompanying citation counts. Quantitative evaluation of publication and citation data is used in science fields to evaluate growth, maturity, leading authors, conceptual and intellectual maps, trend of a scientific community. Bibliometrics is also used in research performance evaluation, especially in university and government labs, and also by policymakers, research directors and administrators, information specialists and librarians, and scholars themselves.

The package is written in R, an open-source environment and ecosystem. The existence of many statistical algorithms, access to numerical routines, and integrated data visualization tools could be the qualities to prefer R to other languages for scientific computation.

Bibliometrix supports scholars in key phases of analysis:

1. Data importing and conversion to R data-frame;
2. Descriptive analysis of a publication dataset;
3. Network extraction for co-citation, coupling, and collaboration analyses. Matrices are the input data for performing network analysis, factorial analysis or multidimensional scaling analysis;
4. Text mining of manuscripts (title, abstract, authors' keywords, etc.);
5. Co-word analysis.

== Main functions of Bibliometrix package ==
The following table lists the main functions of bibliometrix package:

Software assisted workflow steps	Bibliometrix function	Description
Data loading and converting	• Convert2df()	• It creates a bibliographic data frame
Data Analysis Descriptive bibliometric analysis	• biblioAnalysis() • Summary() and plot() • citations() • localCitations() • dominance() • Hindex() • lotka()	• It returns an object of class bibliometrix • They summarize the main results of the bibliometric analysis • It identifies the most cited references or authors • It identifies the most cited local authors • It calculates the authors' dominance ranking • It measures productivity and citation impact of a scholar • It estimates Lotka's law coefficients for scientific productivity
Data Analysis Term Extraction	• termExtraction()	• it extracts terms from textual fields (abstracts, titles, author's keywords, etc.) of a bibliographic collection
Data Analysis Bi-partite networks	• cocMatrix()	• It computes a bipartite network
Data Analysis Normalization	• couplingSimilarity()	• It calculates Jaccard or Salton similarity coefficient among manuscripts of a coupling network
Data Analysis Data Reduction	External functions from other R packages	Other R packages suggested for bibliometric analysis • factominer: for PCA and MCA • cmdscale: for MDS • cluster: for clustering
Data Analysis Similarity matrix (square network matrix)	• biblioNetwork()	• It calculates the most frequently used coupling networks
Data visualization Mapping	External functions from other R packages	Other R packages suggested for mapping • igraph for social network • ggplot2 for bi-dimensional maps • cluster for dendrogram
