= David G. Robinson =

David G. Robinson may refer to:

- David G. Robinson (theatre pioneer) (19th century), theatrical pioneer in Northern California
- David G. Robinson (data scientist) (fl. 2010s–2020s), American data scientist
