= TableCurve 3D =

Software product

- Developer(s): Systat Software Inc.
- Stable release: 4.0.0 / 2007
- Operating system: Windows
- Type: 3D linear and non-linear surface fitting software
- License: proprietary
- Website: SYSTAT

TableCurve 3D is a linear and non-linear surface fitting software package for engineers and scientists that automates the surface fitting process and in a single processing step, fits and ranks about 36,000 out of over 450 million built-in frequently encountered equations, enabling users to find the ideal model to their 3D data.

Once the user has selected the best fit equation, they can output function and test programming codes or generate reports and publication quality graphs.

TableCurve 3D was developed by Ron Brown of AISN Software. TableCurve 3D 1.0 was introduced to the scientific market in September 1993. Version 1.0 was a Windows based 16-bit product. In February 1995, the 32-bit version 2.0 was released.

It was initially distributed by Jandel Scientific Software but by January 2004, Systat Software acquired the exclusive worldwide rights from SPSS, Inc. to distribute SigmaPlot and other Sigma Series products. SYSTAT Software is now based in San Jose, California.

== Related links ==
- SYSTAT
- PeakFit
- TableCurve 2D
