= Posit =

Posit or POSIT may refer to:

- Postulate
- Posit (number format), a format to store numbers in computers introduced in 2017
- POSIT, a computer vision algorithm that performs 3D pose estimation
- Posit PBC (formerly known as RStudio, PBC)

== See also ==
- Postulator, one who guides a cause for Catholic beatification or canonization
