= Dplyr =

R package

dplyr
- Original authors: Hadley Wickham, Romain François, Lionel Henry, Kirill Müller, Davis Vaughan
- Initial release: January 7, 2014; 12 years ago
- Stable release: 1.2.1 / 3 April 2026; 40 days ago
- Written in: R
- License: MIT License
- Website: dplyr.tidyverse.org//
- Repository: github.com/tidyverse/dplyr

dplyr is an R package whose set of functions are designed to enable dataframe (a spreadsheet-like data structure) manipulation in an intuitive, user-friendly way. It is one of the core packages of the popular tidyverse set of packages in the R programming language. Data analysts typically use dplyr in order to transform existing datasets into a format better suited for some particular type of analysis, or data visualization.

For instance, someone seeking to analyze a large dataset may wish to only view a smaller subset of the data. Alternatively, a user may wish to rearrange the data in order to see the rows ranked by some numerical value, or even based on a combination of values from the original dataset. Functions within the dplyr package will allow a user to perform such tasks.

dplyr was launched in 2014. On the dplyr web page, the package is described as "a grammar of data manipulation, providing a consistent set of verbs that help you solve the most common data manipulation challenges."

== The five core verbs ==
While dplyr actually includes several dozen functions that enable various forms of data manipulation, the package features five primary verbs or actions:

- filter(), which is used to extract rows from a dataframe, based on conditions specified by a user;
- select(), which is used to subset a dataframe by its columns;
- arrange(), which is used to sort rows in a dataframe based on attributes held by particular columns;
- mutate(), which is used to create new variables, by altering and/or combining values from existing columns; and
- summarize(), also spelled summarise(), which is used to collapse values from a dataframe into a single summary.

== Additional functions ==
In addition to its five main verbs, dplyr also includes several other functions that enable exploration and manipulation of dataframes. Included among these are:

- count(), which is used to sum the number of unique observations that contain some particular value or categorical attribute;
- rename(), which enables a user to alter the column names for variables, often to improve ease of use and intuitive understanding of a dataset;
- slice_max(), which returns a data subset that contains the rows with the highest number of values for some particular variable;
- slice_min(), which returns a data subset that contains the rows with the lowest number of values for some particular variable.

== Built-in datasets ==
The dplyr package comes with five datasets. These are: band_instruments, band_instruments2, band_members, starwars, storms.

== Copyright & license ==
The copyright to dplyr is held by Posit PBC, formerly RStudio PBC. dplyr was originally released under a GPL license, but in 2022, Posit changed the license terms for the package to the "more permissive" MIT License. The main difference between the two types of license is that the MIT license allows subsequent re-use of code within proprietary software, whereas a GPL license does not.
