= Posit PBC =

Open-source data science software company

- Posit logo
- Formerly: RStudio Inc, RStudio PBC
- Type: Private
- Industry: Software publishing and SaaS platforms
- Founded: 2009; 17 years ago
- Founder: J. J. Allaire
- Headquarters: Boston, Massachusetts, US
- Key people: Hadley Wickham; Wes McKinney; Jenny Bryan; Julia Silge
- Products: RStudio IDE; tidyverse; Posit Workbench; Posit Connect
- Website: posit.co

Posit PBC (or Posit) is an open-source data science software company. It is a public-benefit corporation founded by J. J. Allaire, creator of the programming language ColdFusion.

Posit has no formal connection to the R Foundation for Statistical Computing, a not-for-profit organization located in Vienna, Austria, which is responsible for overseeing development of the R environment for statistical computing.

Posit was formerly known as RStudio Inc. In July 2022, it announced that it changed its name to Posit, to signify its broadening exploration towards other programming languages such as Python.

== History ==
Former company logo when it was RStudio

Before the company started, Allaire initially started RStudio, the integrated development environment (IDE), as an open source project. He recruited Joe Cheng to help work on this project, who would eventually become Posit's CTO. Moreover, Cheng would conceptualize and develop the Shiny web framework in 2012.

In August 2012, Hadley Wickham, Winston Chang, and Garrett Grolemund joined Posit (at the time RStudio Inc.). Wickham was known for working on packages such as ggplot2 and plyr. Chang was known for also working on ggplot2, and publishing the book R Graphics Cookbook. Grolemund was known for working on the lubridate R package, which makes working with dates and time data types easier.

Shiny hex logo

In November 2013, Yihui Xie joined Posit to work on the Shiny package. He created the knitr, cranvas, and animation packages, among others.

In November 2016, Jenny Bryan and Max Kuhn joined Posit. Bryan was an associate professor of statistics at the University of British Columbia in Vancouver. She worked on R packages like googlesheets and was part of the leadership team at rOpenSci, an organization to help develop more R tools for the scientific community. Kuhn, formerly senior director of nonclinical statistics at Pfizer and co-author of the book Applied Predictive Modeling, was hired to improve the statistical modeling capabilities in the tidyverse.

In January 2020, it was announced that RStudio Inc. would be restructured to be a public benefit corporation, RStudio PBC. RStudio is privately held, and venture capital firm General Catalyst owns a minority stake in the company.

In July 2022, it was announced at the annual company conference, rstudio::conf, that RStudio PBC will be renamed to Posit PBC. The name change was to signal an expansion in focus among its products and services beyond R, such as Python. Previously, the "RStudio" brand made it more difficult for Python users to convert to using their products. Posit's commercial products were renamed Posit Connect, Posit Workbench, and Posit Package Manager.

In November 2023, Wes McKinney, creator of the Python package pandas, joined Posit as a principal architect. He was hired to advocate for the needs of the Python data ecosystem at Posit.

In December 2023, Xie was laid off. In his time at Posit, Xie worked on R packages such as R Markdown, knitr, blogdown, and bookdown.

== Products ==
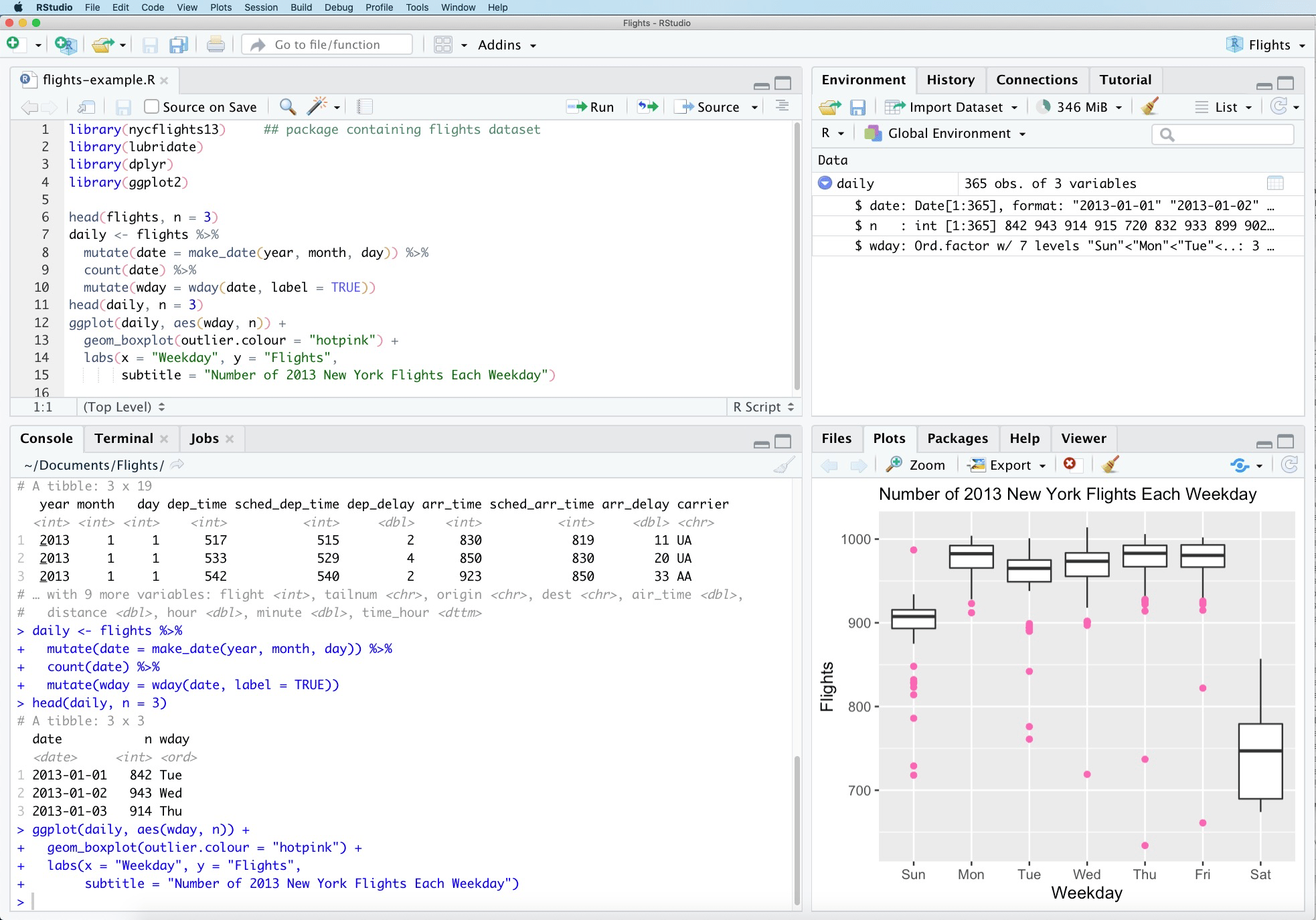
RStudio IDE screenshot

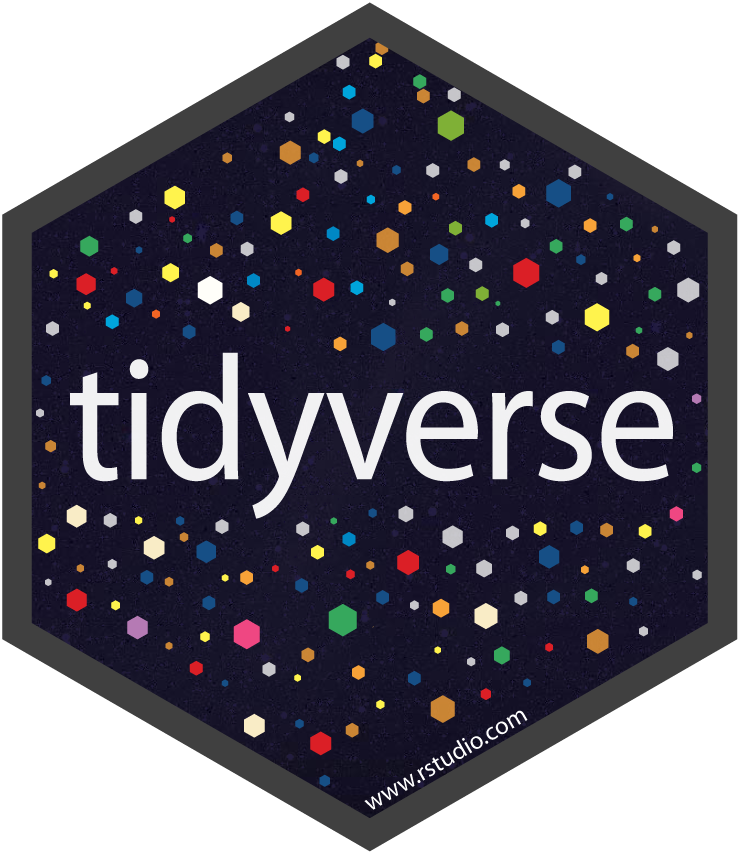
tidyverse hex logo

Posit has a range of free and open-source products, along with its personal and enterprise solutions offering both free and paid plans.

=== Open source ===
- tidyverse – suite of software packages for data analysis
- Shiny – software to develop web applications
- RStudio IDE – enhanced code editor for data analysis
- Quarto – generate reproducible analyses and reports
- ggplot2 – implementation of Grammar of Graphics for data visualization

=== Personal ===
- Posit Cloud – run data analyses in your browser
- Shinyapps.io – host Shiny web applications
- Public Package Manager (PPM) – package management, optimized for data science to help with reproducibility and collaboration
- Positron IDE – a code editor for data science

=== Enterprise ===
- Posit Workbench – centralized server to collaborate on R and Python projects with
- Posit Connect – share data science content, like Shiny applications, across the organization
- Posit Package Manager – control, organize, and govern the use of software packages
- Posit Team – bundles Workbench, Connect, and Package Manager together
- Posit Academy – mentor-led apprenticeships for learning data science skills

== Conferences ==
Posit hosts conferences for the R developer community. They include a general conference (posit::conf, formerly rstudio::conf) and a Shiny developer conference.

=== General conference ===
List of RStudio conferences
Date	Location	Name	Link	Talks	References/notes
January 13 - January 14, 2017	Orlando, FL	rstudio::conf 2017	Website		First RStudio conference
January 31 - February 3, 2018	San Diego, CA	rstudio::conf 2018	Website		
January 15 - January 18, 2019	Austin, TX	rstudio::conf 2019	Website		
January 27 - January 30, 2020	San Francisco, CA	rstudio::conf 2020	Website		
January 21, 2021	Online	rstudio::global(2021)	Website		Online conference due to COVID-19 pandemic
July 25 - July 28, 2022	Washington D.C.	rstudio::conf(2022)		Talks	RStudio rebrands to Posit
September 17 - September 20, 2023	Chicago, IL	posit::conf(2023)		Talks	
August 12 - August 14, 2024	Seattle, WA	posit::conf(2024)		Talks	
September 16 - September 18, 2025	Atlanta, GA	posit::conf(2025)		Talks	
September 14 - September 16, 2026	Houston, TX	posit::conf(2026)			
