= TableCurve 2D =

- Developer: Systat Software Inc.
- Stable release: 5.0.1 / 2007
- Operating system: Windows
- Type: 2D linear and non-linear curve fitting software
- License: proprietary
- Website: SYSTAT

TableCurve 2D is a linear d non-linear curve fitting software package for engineers and scientists that automates the curve fitting process and in a single processing step instantly fits and ranks 3,600+ built-in frequently encountered equations enabling users to easily find the ideal model to their 2D data within seconds.

Once the user has selected the best fit equation, they can output high-quality function and test programming codes or generate comprehensive reports and publication quality graphs.

TableCurve 2D was originally developed by Ron Brown of AISN Software. The first version of TableCurve 2D was released in 1989 for MS-DOS. The first Windows version was introduced in the last quarter of 1992.

It was distributed by Jandel Scientific Software. By January 2004, Systat Software acquired the exclusive worldwide rights from SPSS, Inc. to distribute SigmaPlot and other Sigma Series products. Systat Software is now based in San Jose, California.

== Related links ==
- SYSTAT
- PeakFit
- TableCurve 3D
