= TidyTuesday =

Community of practice for data practitioners

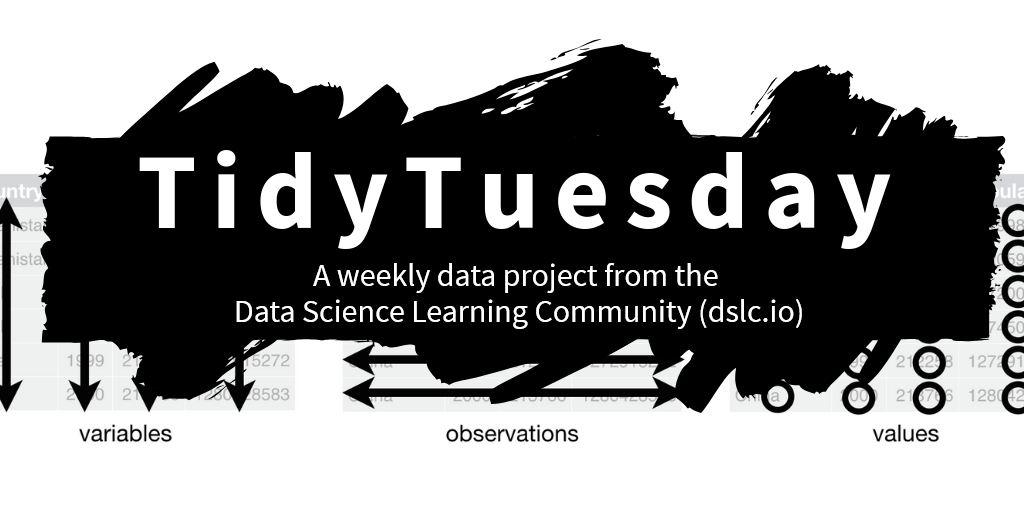
TidyTuesday logo

TidyTuesday, also noted as Tidy Tuesday, tidytuesday, or #tidytuesday, is a weekly community of practice that is currently organized by the Data Science Learning Community (DSLC). A new data set is highlighted each week for participants to practice exploring, visualizing, and sharing findings. Participants can follow the daily hashtag #tidytuesday on social media.

== History ==
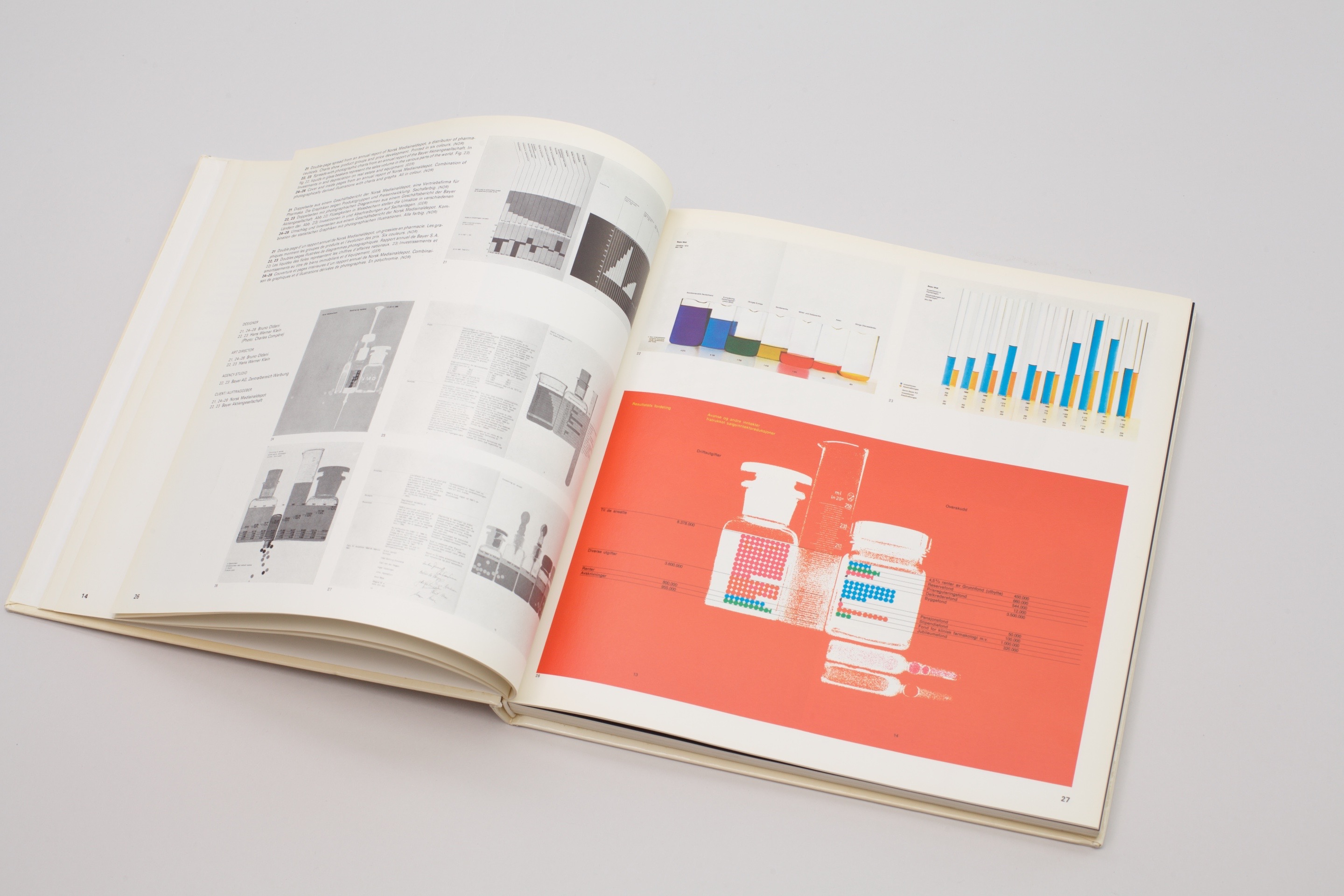
Example data visualizations

TidyTuesday was started by Tom Mock, a product manager at Posit PBC, on April 1, 2018. The motivations to create this was for newcomers to data and more experienced data scientists to feel less socially isolated and a means to practice skills like acquiring, cleaning, wrangling, visualizing and presenting data. Some participants have shared feeling inspired by others' data visualizations and noting that most people will share their code in order to replicate their work.

== Impact ==
TidyTuesday has also been used by other groups or features published data. R-Ladies Global have used TidyTuesday datasets as a hackathon to practice data skills. In February 2021, Allen Hillery, Athony Starks, and Sekou Tyler, started the #DuboisChallenge. This challenge had participants use modern data visualization tools to recreate the data visualizations by sociologist and activist W.E.B.Du Bois. Then in 2021 and 2022, TidyTuesday highlighted these datasets for the data community. In 2021, TidyTuesday featured the zipcodeR dataset that contains 41,000 ZIP codes for analysis.

Data visualization by W.E.B. Du Bois

Educators training data scientists have struggled to coordinate their preparation, but some have suggested to create a portfolio to have highlight technical skills and data thinking skills. TidyTuesday is one suggested way to find datasets to create a formal, visual project. This can be a means to help teach novice data practitioners on how to better program in programming languages like the R programming language.

== See also ==
- Tidyverse
