= Hartman–Grobman theorem =

Theorem in dynamical system mathematics

In mathematics, in the study of dynamical systems, the Hartman–Grobman theorem or linearization theorem is a theorem about the local behaviour of dynamical systems in the neighbourhood of a hyperbolic equilibrium point. It asserts that linearization—a natural simplification of the system—is effective in predicting qualitative patterns of behaviour. The theorem owes its name to Philip Hartman and David M. Grobman.

The theorem states that the behaviour of a dynamical system in a domain near a hyperbolic equilibrium point is qualitatively the same as the behaviour of its linearization near this equilibrium point, where hyperbolicity means that no eigenvalue of the linearization has real part equal to zero. Therefore, when dealing with such dynamical systems one can use the simpler linearization of the system to analyse its behaviour around equilibria.

== Main theorem ==
Consider a system evolving in time with state $u(t)\in\mathbb R^n$ that satisfies the differential equation $du/dt=f(u)$ for some smooth map $f \colon \mathbb{R}^n \to \mathbb{R}^n$. Now suppose the map has a hyperbolic equilibrium state $u^*\in\mathbb R^n$: that is, $f(u^*)=0$ and the Jacobian matrix $A=[\partial f_i/\partial x_j]$ of $f$ at state $u^*$ has no eigenvalue with real part equal to zero. Then there exists a neighbourhood $N$ of the equilibrium $u^*$ and a homeomorphism $h \colon N \to \mathbb{R}^n$, such that $h(u^*)=0$ and such that in the neighbourhood $N$ the flow of $du/dt=f(u)$ is topologically conjugate by the continuous map $U=h(u)$ to the flow of its linearization $dU/dt=AU$. A like result holds for iterated maps, and for fixed points of flows or maps on manifolds.

A mere topological conjugacy does not provide geometric information about the behavior near the equilibrium. Indeed, neighborhoods of any two equilibria are topologically conjugate so long as the dimensions of the contracting directions (negative eigenvalues) match and the dimensions of the expanding directions (positive eigenvalues) match. But the topological conjugacy in this context does provide the full geometric picture. In effect, the nonlinear phase portrait near the equilibrium is a thumbnail of the phase portrait of the linearized system. This is the meaning of the following regularity results, and it is illustrated by the saddle equilibrium in the example below.

Even for infinitely differentiable maps $f$, the homeomorphism $h$ need not to be smooth, nor even locally Lipschitz. However, it turns out to be Hölder continuous, with exponent arbitrarily close to 1. Moreover, on a surface, i.e., in dimension 2, the linearizing homeomorphism and its inverse are continuously differentiable (with, as in the example below, the differential at the equilibrium being the identity) but need not be $C^2$. And in any dimension, if $f$ has Hölder continuous derivative, then the linearizing homeomorphism is differentiable at the equilibrium and its differential at the equilibrium is the identity.

The Hartman–Grobman theorem has been extended to infinite-dimensional Banach spaces, non-autonomous systems $du/dt=f(u,t)$ (potentially stochastic), and to cater for the topological differences that occur when there are eigenvalues with zero or near-zero real-part.

== Example ==
The algebra necessary for this example is easily carried out by a web service that computes normal form coordinate transforms of systems of differential equations, autonomous or non-autonomous, deterministic or stochastic.

Consider the 2D system in variables $u = (y,z)$ evolving according to the pair of coupled differential equations

$$\frac{dy}{dt} = -3y + yz \quad\text{and}\quad \frac{dz}{dt} = z+y^2.$$

By direct computation it can be seen that the only equilibrium of this system lies at the origin, that is $u^* = 0$. The coordinate transform, $u = h^{-1}(U)$ where $U = (Y,Z)$, given by

$$\begin{align}
y & \approx Y + YZ + \tfrac{1}{42} Y^3 + \tfrac{1}{2} Y Z^2 \\[5pt]
z & \approx Z - \tfrac{1}{7} Y^2 - \tfrac{1}{3} Y^2 Z
\end{align}$$

is a smooth map between the original $u = (y,z)$ and new $U = (Y,Z)$ coordinates, at least near the equilibrium at the origin. In the new coordinates the dynamical system transforms to its linearization

$$\frac{dY}{dt} = -3Y \quad\text{and}\quad \frac{dZ}{dt} = Z.$$

That is, a distorted version of the linearization gives the original dynamics in some finite neighbourhood.

== See also ==
- Linear approximation
- Stable manifold theorem
