= Alec Wilkinson =

American journalist

- Born: March 29, 1952 (age 73); Mount Kisco, New York
- Occupation: writer
- Employer: The New Yorker
- Children: 1
- Relatives: Leland Wilkinson (brother); Amie Wilkinson (niece)
- Awards: Robert F. Kennedy Book Award

Alec Wilkinson (born March 29, 1952) is an American writer who has been on the staff of The New Yorker since 1980.

According to The Philadelphia Inquirer, he is among the "first rank of" contemporary American (20th and early 21st century) "literary journalists...(reminiscent) of Naipaul, Norman Mailer and Agee".

== Career ==
Wilkinson is the author of eleven books. His most recent book is A Divine Language: Learning Algebra, Geometry, and Calculus at the Edge of Old Age. Before that, he published The Ice Balloon in 2012, an account of the Swedish visionary aeronaut S.A. Andree's attempt, in 1897, to discover the North Pole by flying to it in a hydrogen balloon. He is also the author of "Sister Sorry," a play based on "The Confession," a story of his that appeared in The New Yorker in 1993. “Sister Sorry” had its premiere at Barrington Stage Company in Pittsfield, Massachusetts during their 2021 season.

Before Wilkinson was a writer, he spent a year as a policeman in Wellfleet, Massachusetts, on Cape Cod, which is the subject of Midnights, a Year with the Wellfleet Police, and before that he was a rock and roll musician, playing in a number of bands, including one in Berkeley, California with Tony Garnier, Bob Dylan's longtime bass player and bandleader.

Wilkinson began writing when he was 24, showing work to William Maxwell, his father's friend, who in addition to being a novelist and short-story writer, had for forty years been an editor of fiction at The New Yorker. They worked together closely for years. Maxwell died in July 2000. My Mentor describes their friendship.

== Personal life ==
Wilkinson is married, has a son, and lives in New York City. He is the brother of computer scientist Leland Wilkinson.

== Awards ==
Wilkinson's honors include a Lyndhurst Prize and a Robert F. Kennedy Book Award. He received a Guggenheim fellowship in 1987.

== Publications ==
=== Books ===
- Midnights, a Year with the Wellfleet Police. New York: Random House, 1982.
- Moonshine: a Life in Pursuit of White Liquor. New York: Knopf, 1985. ISBN 0394545877.
- Big Sugar (1989).
- The Riverkeeper (1992). ISBN 0679741348
- A Violent Act (1993). ISBN 0679749829
- My Mentor (2002). ISBN 0618382690
- Mr. Apology and other essays (2003). ISBN 0618123113
- The Happiest Man in the World (2007). ISBN 1407013114
- The protest singer : an Intimate Portrait of Pete Seeger. New York: Alfred A. Knopf, 2009. ISBN 0307272370
- The Ice Balloon (2012). ISBN 000746004X
- A Divine Language (2022). ISBN 1250168570

=== Articles ===
- "Illuminating the Brain's 'Utter Darkness'" (review of Benjamin Ehrlich, The Brain in Search of Itself: Santiago Ramón y Cajal and the Story of the Neuron, Farrar, Straus and Giroux, 2023, 447 pp.; and Timothy J. Jorgensen, Spark: The Life of Electricity and the Electricity of Life, Princeton University Press, 2021, 436 pp.), The New York Review of Books, vol. LXX, no. 2 (February 9, 2023), pp. 32, 34–35.
- "The Wandering Physicist" (review of Alec Nevala-Lee, Collisions: A Physicist's Journey from Hiroshima to the Death of the Dinosaurs, Norton, 2025, 338 pp.), The New York Review of Books, vol. LXXIII, no. 4 (12 March 2026), pp. 26–27. "In the twentieth century, perhaps no physicist, and maybe no scientist, ranged more widely or with more effect than Luis Alvarez..." (p. 26.)
