= Philip Hartman =

American mathematician

- Born: 16 May 1915; Baltimore
- Died: 28 August 2015 (aged 100)
- Education: Johns Hopkins University
- Known for: Hartman–Grobman theorem, Hartman–Watson distribution
- Awards: Guggenheim Fellowship (Mathematics, 1950), Honorary Member of the AMS
- Scientific career
- Fields: Mathematics
- Workplaces: Johns Hopkins University; Queens College
- Doctoral advisor: Aurel Wintner
- Doctoral students: Charles C. Pugh

Philip Hartman (May 16, 1915 – August 28, 2015) was an American mathematician at Johns Hopkins University working on differential equations who introduced the Hartman–Grobman theorem. He served as Chairman of the Mathematics Department at Johns Hopkins for several years. He has an Erdös number of 2.

His book gives a necessary and sufficient condition for solutions of ordinary initial value problems to be unique and to depend on a class C^{1} manner on the initial conditions for solutions.

He died in August 2015 at the age of 100.

The Hartman–Watson distribution is named after him and Geoffrey S. Watson.

== Publications ==
- Hartman, Philip (2002) [1964], Ordinary differential equations, Classics in Applied Mathematics, vol. 38, Philadelphia: Society for Industrial and Applied Mathematics, ISBN 978-0-89871-510-1, MR 1929104
