= SYSTAT (statistics package) =

- Developer: Systat Software Inc.
- Stable release: 13 / 2009
- Operating system: Windows, DOS, Classic Mac OS
- Type: Statistical package
- License: Proprietary
- Website: SYSTAT

SYSTAT is a graphical statistical software package. It was one of the earliest statistical software ever to be ported for personal computers. It was originally developed by Leland Wilkinson in the late 1970s, who was at the time an assistant professor of psychology at the University of Illinois Chicago. Wilkinson based SYSTAT loosely off of a statistical software application developed by the SAS Institute for mainframe computers. He developed the base algorithms starting in the late 1970s and delivered the first version of the software on CP/M for the Cromemco Z-2 in 1980. In order to market SYSTAT, Wilkinson and his wife Ruth Van Demark incorporated Systat Software Inc. in Chicago, Illinois, in 1983. The company eventually grew to over 50 employees. After the decline of CP/M, the company ported SYSTAT to PC DOS in 1984. It was ported to the Macintosh in 1986 and Windows in 1992.

In 1995, SYSTAT was sold to SPSS Inc., who marketed the product to a scientific audience under the SPSS Science division. By 2002, SPSS had changed its focus to business analytics and decided to sell SYSTAT to Cranes Software in Bangalore, India. Cranes formed Systat Software, Inc. to market and distribute SYSTAT in the US, and a number of other divisions for global distribution. The headquarters are in San Jose.

By 2005, SYSTAT was in its eleventh version having a revamped codebase completely changed from Fortran into C++. Version 13 came out in 2009, with improvements in the user interface and several new features. On January 15, 2024, SYSTAT was transferred to Grafiti LLC.

== See also ==
- Comparison of statistical packages
- PeakFit
- TableCurve 2D
- TableCurve 3D
