= Hartman–Watson distribution =

Probability distribution related to Brownian motion

The Hartman–Watson distribution is an absolutely continuous probability distribution which arises in the study of Brownian functionals. It is named after Philip Hartman and Geoffrey S. Watson, who encountered the distribution while studying the relationship between Brownian motion on the n-sphere and the von Mises distribution. Important contributions to the distribution, such as an explicit form of the density in integral representation and a connection to Brownian exponential functionals, came from Marc Yor.

The Hartman-Watson distribution determines the joint distribution of the time integral of a geometric Brownian motion and its terminal value. This relation underlies its applications in financial mathematics. Notable applications are pricing Asian options in the Black-Scholes model and European options in stochastic volatility models with volatility following a geometric Brownian motion, such as the SABR model.

== Hartman–Watson distribution ==
=== Definition ===
The Hartman–Watson distributions are the probability distributions $(\mu_r)_{r>0}$, which satisfy the following relationship between the Laplace transform and the modified Bessel function of first kind:

$\int_0^\infty e^{-u^2t/2}\mu_r(\mathrm{d}t)=\frac{I_{|u|}(r)}{I_0(r)}\quad$ for $u\in \R,\; r>0$,

where $I_\nu(r)$ denoted the modified Bessel function defined as

=== Explicit representation ===
The unnormalized density of the Hartman-Watson distribution is

$$\theta(r,t):=\frac{r}{(2\pi^3 t)^{1/2}}e^{\pi^2/2t}\int_0^{\infty}e^{-x^2/2t-r\cosh(x)}\sinh(x)\sin\left(\frac{\pi x}{t}\right)\mathrm{d}x$$

for $r>0,\;t>0$.

It satisfies the equation

$\int_0^\infty e^{-u^2t/2}\theta(r,t)\mathrm{d}t=I_{|u|}(r) \quad \text{for}\;\;r>0.$

The density of the Hartman-Watson distribution is defined on $\mathbb{R}_+$ and given by

$$f_r(t)=\frac{\theta(r,t)}{I_0(t)}\quad \text{for}\;\;r>0,\;t\geq 0$$

or explicitly

$f_r(t)=\frac{r}{(2\pi^3 t)^{1/2}}\frac{\exp\left(\pi^2/2t\right)\int_0^{\infty}\exp\left(-x^2/2t-r\cosh(x)\right)\sinh(x)\sin\left(\frac{\pi x}{t}\right)\mathrm{d}x}{ \sum\limits_{n=0}^\infty 2^{-2n}t^{2n}/(n!)^2}\quad$ for $r>0,\;t\geq 0$.

== Connection to Brownian exponential functionals ==
The following result by Yor establishes a connection between the unnormalized Hartman-Watson density $\theta(r,t)$ and Brownian exponential functionals.

Let $(B_t^{(\mu)})_{t\geq 0}:=(B_t+\mu t)_{t\geq 0}$ be a one-dimensional Brownian motion starting in $0$ with drift $\mu\in\R$. Let $A^{(\mu)}:=(A^{\mu}_t)_{t\geq 0}$ be the following Brownian functional

$A^{(\mu)}_t=\int_0^t\exp\left(2B_s^{(\mu)}\right)\mathrm{d}s\quad$ for $\;t\geq 0$

Then the distribution of $(A^{(\mu)}_t,B^{(\mu)}_t)$ for $t>0$ is given by

$$P\left(A^{(\mu)}_t\in \mathrm{d}u,B^{(\mu)}_t\in \mathrm{d}x\right)=e^{\mu x-\mu^2t/2}\exp\left(-\frac{1+e^{2x}}{2u}\right)\theta(e^{x}/u,t)\frac{1}{u}\mathrm{d}u \mathrm{d}x$$

where $u>0$ und $x\in\R$.

$P\left(X\in \mathrm{d}x,Y\in \mathrm{d}y\right)$ is an alternative notation for a probability measure $\lambda(dx,dy)$.

== Computation ==
A direct numerical evaluation of θ(r,t) using the integral representation is unstable for small t. This is an issue in applications to mathematical finance, where this parameter is typically small. An efficient method for the numerical evaluation of this integral uses an asymptotic expansion as t→0 in the limit r t = ρ constant obtained from a saddle point approach. The leading order terms in this expansion are

$\theta(\rho/t,t)=\frac{1}{2\pi t} e^{-\frac{1}{t}(F(\rho)-\frac{\pi^2}{2})}\Big(G(\rho) + G_1(\rho)t + O(t^2)\Big)$

where F(ρ),G(ρ) are known functions. The application of this expansion to pricing Asian options in the Black–Scholes model reduces the numerical evaluation of a 3-dimensional integral to a two-dimensional integration, and was illustrated with numerical examples in.
