= Amie Wilkinson =

American mathematician

- Born: Anne Marie Wilkinson; 1968 (age 57–58)
- Occupations: mathematician; professor
- Spouse: Benson Farb (m. 1996)
- Relatives: Leland Wilkinson (father); Alec Wilkinson (uncle)
- Awards: Ruth Lyttle Satter Prize in Mathematics (2011); Levi L. Conant Prize (2020)

Academic background
- Education: Harvard University (B.A.); University of California, Berkeley (Ph.D.)
- Thesis: Stable Ergodicity of the Time-One Map of a Geodesic Flow (1995)
- Doctoral advisor: Charles C. Pugh

Academic work
- Institutions: Northwestern University, University of Chicago
- Main interests: diffeomorphism; ergodicity; hyperbolicity
- Website: math.uchicago.edu/~wilkinso

Anne Marie Wilkinson (born 1968) is an American mathematician and professor of mathematics at the University of Chicago. Her research topics include smooth dynamical systems, ergodic theory, chaos theory, and semisimple Lie groups. Wilkinson, in collaboration with Christian Bonatti and Sylvain Crovisier, partially resolved the twelfth problem on Stephen Smale's list of mathematical problems for the 21st Century.

Wilkinson was named a fellow of the American Mathematical Society (AMS) in 2014. She was elected to the Academia Europaea in 2019 and the American Academy of Arts and Sciences in 2021. In 2020, she received the Levi L. Conant Prize of the AMS for her overview article on the modern theory of Lyapunov exponents and their applications to diverse areas of dynamical systems and mathematical physics.

== Biography ==
Anne Marie Wilkinson was born to Ruth E. VanDemark and Leland Wilkinson.

She received a Bachelor of Arts degree in mathematics from Harvard University in 1989 and a PhD in Mathematics from the University of California, Berkeley in 1995 under the direction of Charles C. Pugh. She is currently a professor of mathematics at the University of Chicago and was previously a professor of mathematics at Northwestern University.

== Work ==
Wilkinson's work focuses on the geometric and statistical properties of diffeomorphisms and flows with a particular emphasis on stable ergodicity and partial hyperbolicity. In a series of papers with Christian Bonatti and Sylvain Crovisier, Wilkinson studied centralizers of diffeomorphisms settling the C^{1} case of the twelfth problem on Stephen Smale's list of mathematical problems for the 21st Century.

== Awards ==
Wilkinson was the recipient of the 2011 Satter Prize in Mathematics, in part for her work with Keith Burns on stable ergodicity of partially hyperbolic systems.

She gave an invited talk, "Dynamical Systems and Ordinary Differential Equations", in the International Congress of Mathematicians 2010 in Hyderabad, India.

In 2013 she became a fellow of the American Mathematical Society, for "contributions to dynamical systems". In 2019 she was elected to the Academia Europaea. In 2020 she received the Levi L. Conant Prize of the AMS. She was elected to the American Academy of Arts and Sciences in 2021.

Wilkinson has been featured in articles in Quanta Magazine. Wilkinson is a member of the Board of Advisers of Scientific American.

== Personal life ==
Wilkinson married Benson Farb on December 28, 1996. They are professors in the same department.
