= Charles C. Pugh =

American mathematician

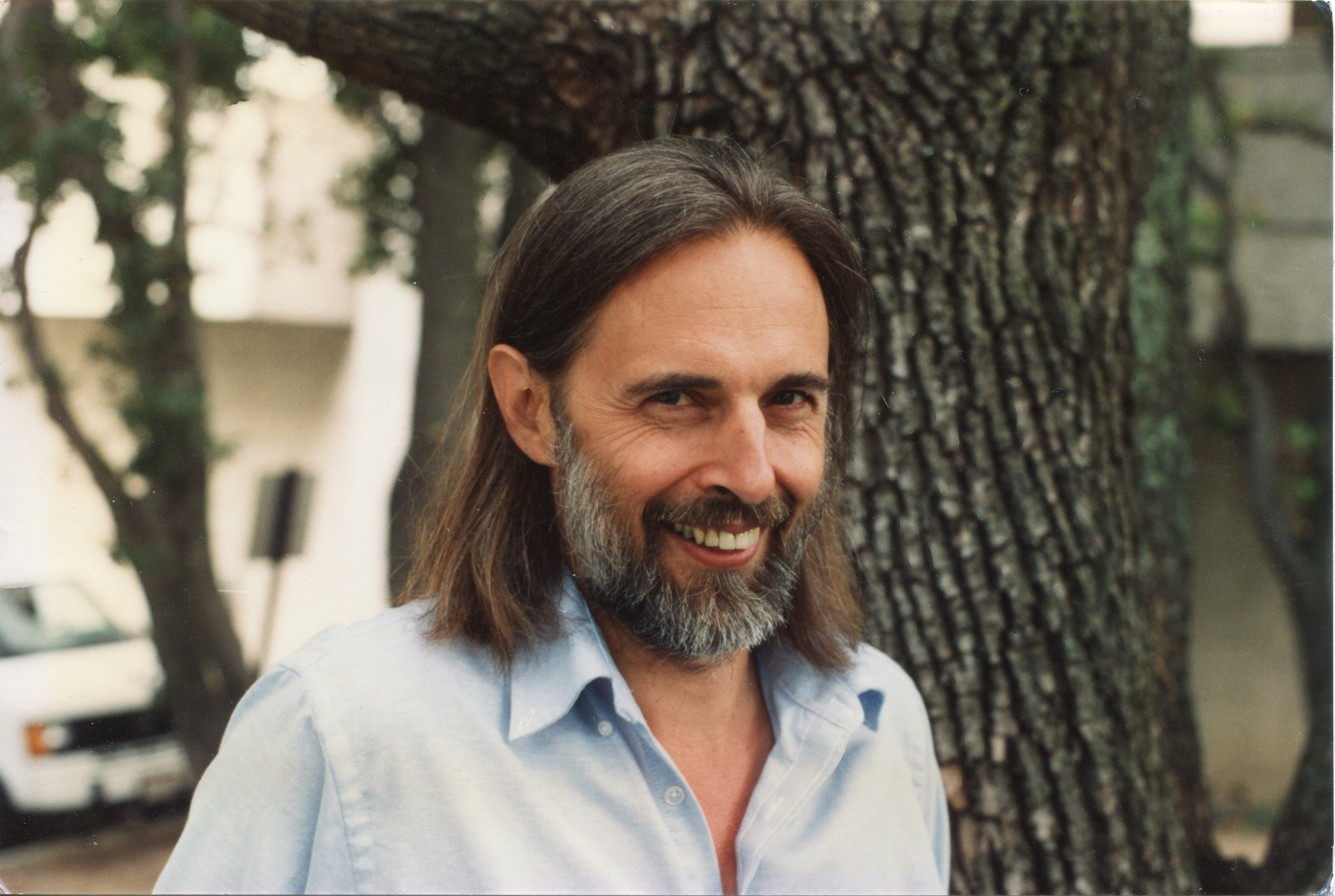
- Charles Pugh, Berkeley, 1993
- Born: June 16, 1940 (age 86); United States
- Education: Johns Hopkins University (PhD)
- Known for: Work in dynamical systems
- Scientific career
- Fields: Mathematics
- Workplaces: University of California, Berkeley
- Thesis: The Closing Lemma for Dimensions Two and Three (1965)
- Doctoral advisor: Philip Hartman
- Doctoral students: Martin M. Wattenberg; Amie Wilkinson
- Website: https://math.berkeley.edu/people/faculty/charles-c-pugh

Charles Chapman Pugh (born June 16, 1940) is an American mathematician who researches dynamical systems. Pugh received his PhD under Philip Hartman of Johns Hopkins University in 1965, with the dissertation The Closing Lemma for Dimensions Two and Three. He has since been a professor, now emeritus, at the University of California, Berkeley.

In 1967, he published a closing lemma named after him in the theory of dynamical systems. The lemma states: Let f be a diffeomorphism of a compact manifold with a nonwandering point x. Then, there is (in the space of diffeomorphisms, equipped with the $C^1$ topology) in a neighborhood of f a diffeomorphism g for which x is a periodic point. That is, by a small perturbation of the original dynamical system, a system with periodic trajectory can be generated.

In 1970, he was an invited speaker at the International Congress of Mathematicians in Nice, delivering a talk on Invariant Manifolds.

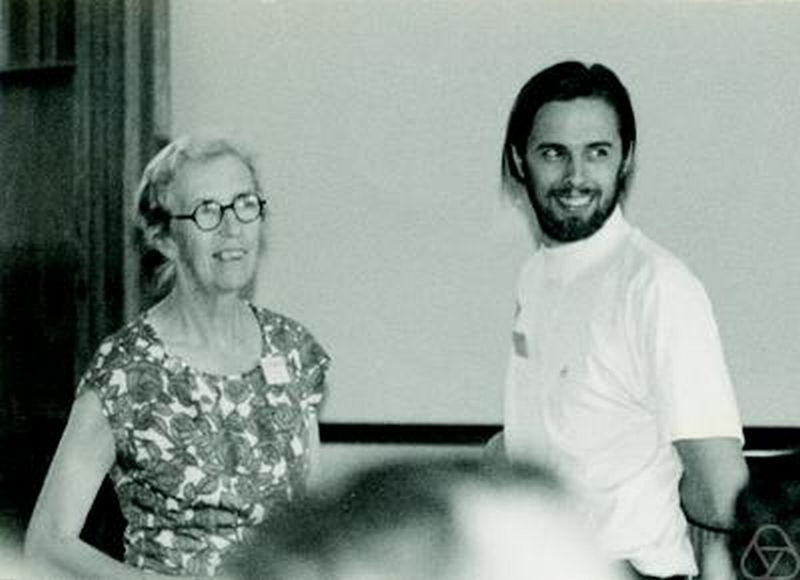
Mary Cartwright (left) with Charles Pugh, Nice, 1970

== Books ==
- Real Mathematical Analysis (2nd Edition), Springer-Verlag, 2015
