= Hadley Wickham =

New Zealand statistician (born 1979)

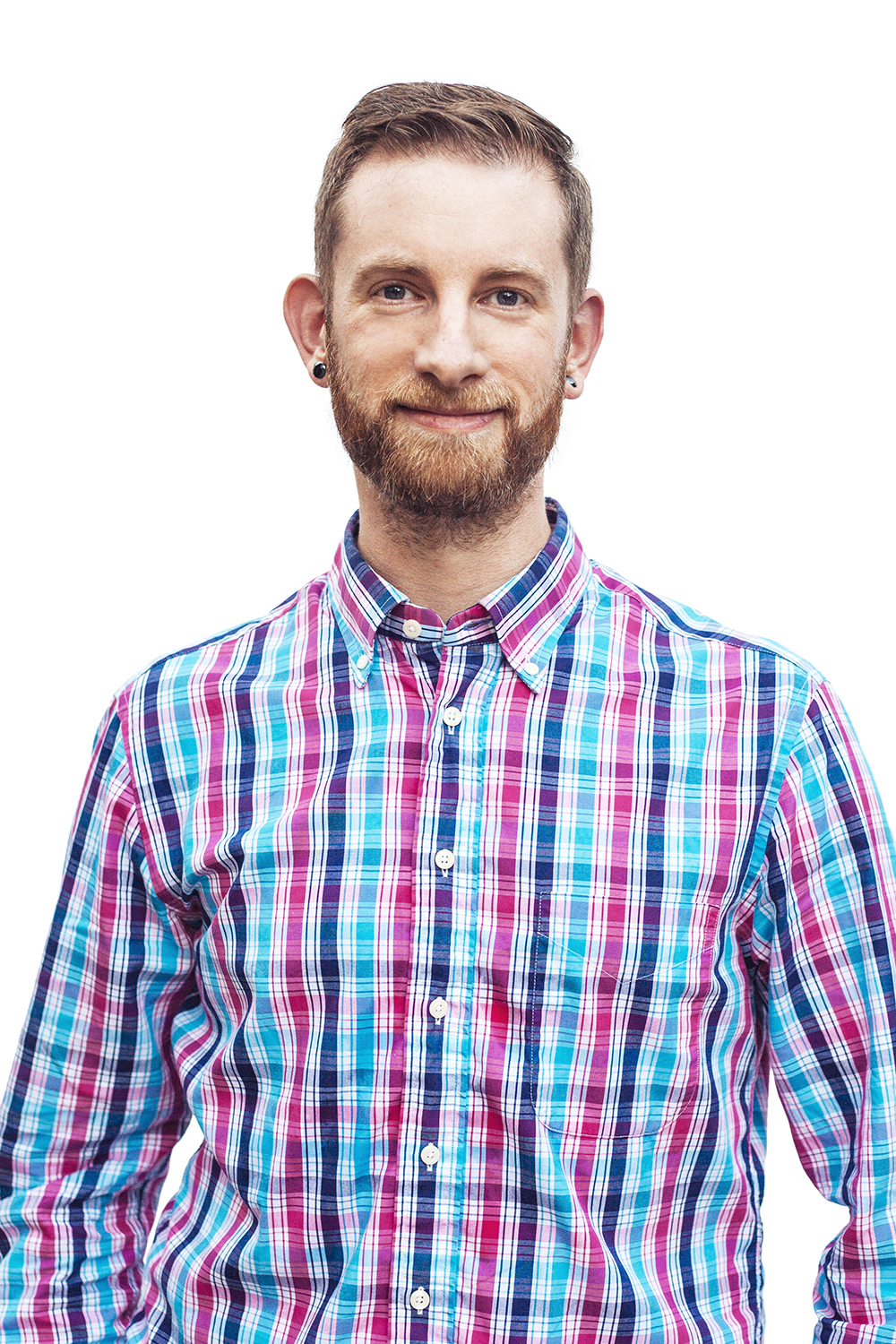
- Hadley Wickham in 2015
- Born: Hadley Alexander Wickham; 14 October 1979 (age 47); Hamilton, New Zealand
- Education: University of Auckland (BSc, MSc); Iowa State University (PhD)
- Known for: ggplot2 tidyverse R packages
- Awards: COPSS Presidents' Award (2019); Fellow of the American Statistical Association (2015)
- Scientific career
- Fields: Data science; Visualization; Statistics
- Workplaces: Posit PBC (former RStudio Inc.); University of Auckland; Stanford University; Rice University
- Thesis: Practical tools for exploring data and models (2008)
- Doctoral advisor: Dianne Cook; Heike Hofmann
- Website: hadley.nz

Hadley Alexander Wickham (born 14 October 1979) is a New Zealand statistician known for his work on open-source software for the R statistical programming environment. He is the chief scientist at Posit PBC and an adjunct professor of statistics at the University of Auckland, Stanford University, and Rice University. His work includes the data visualisation system ggplot2 and the tidyverse, a collection of R packages for data science based on the concept of tidy data.

== Early life and education ==
Wickham was born in Hamilton, New Zealand. He received a bachelor's degree in human biology and a master's degree in statistics at the University of Auckland in 1999–2004 and his PhD at Iowa State University in 2008, supervised by Di Cook and Heike Hofmann.

His sister, Charlotte Wickham, is also a statistician, data scientist and educator. She taught in the Statistics Department at Oregon State University between 2011 and 2022, and currently works for Posit PBC on the developer relations team. She holds a first-class honours bachelor of science degree in Statistics from University of Auckland and a PhD in statistics from University of California, Berkeley.

== Career ==
Wickham is the chief scientist at Posit PBC (formerly RStudio PBC) and an adjunct professor of statistics at the University of Auckland, Stanford University, and Rice University.

He is a prominent and active member of the R user community, and has developed several notable and widely used packages including ggplot2, plyr, dplyr and reshape2. Wickham's data analysis packages for R are collectively known as the tidyverse. According to Wickham's tidy data approach, each variable should be a column, each observation should be a row, and each type of observational unit should be a table.

=== Honors and awards ===
In 2006 he was awarded the John Chambers Award for Statistical Computing for his work developing tools for data reshaping and visualisation. Wickham was named a Fellow by the American Statistical Association in 2015 for "pivotal contributions to statistical practice through innovative and pioneering research in statistical graphics and computing". Wickham was awarded the international COPSS Presidents' Award in 2019 for "influential work in statistical computing, visualisation, graphics, and data analysis" including "making statistical thinking and computing accessible to a large audience".

== Publications ==
Wickham's publications include:

- Wickham, Hadley; Grolemund, Garrett (2017). R for Data Science : Import, Tidy, Transform, Visualize, and Model Data. Sebastopol, CA: O'Reilly Media. ISBN 978-1491910399. OCLC 968213225.
- Wickham, Hadley (2015). R Packages. Sebastopol, CA: O'Reilly Media, Inc. ISBN 978-1491910597.
- Wickham, Hadley (2014). Advanced R. New York: Chapman & Hall/CRC The R Series. ISBN 978-1466586963.
- Wickham, Hadley (2011). "The split-apply-combine strategy for data analysis". Journal of Statistical Software. 40 (1): 1–29. doi:10.18637/jss.v040.i01.
- Wickham, Hadley (2010). "A layered grammar of graphics". Journal of Computational and Graphical Statistics. 19 (1): 3–28. doi:10.1198/jcgs.2009.07098. S2CID 58971746.
- Wickham, Hadley (2010). "stringr: modern, consistent string processing". The R Journal. 2 (2): 3–28. doi:10.32614/RJ-2010-012.
- Wickham, Hadley (2009). ggplot2: Elegant Graphics for Data Analysis (Use R!). New York: Springer. ISBN 978-0387981406.
- Wickham, Hadley (2007). "Reshaping data with the reshape package". Journal of Statistical Software. 21 (12): 1–20. doi:10.18637/jss.v021.i12.
