= Leland Wilkinson =

American statistician and computer scientist (1944–2021)

- Born: November 5, 1944
- Died: December 10, 2021 (aged 77); Lake Forest, Illinois, U.S.
- Education: Harvard University (A.B.); Harvard Divinity School (S.T.B.); Yale University (Ph.D.)
- Known for: The Grammar of Graphics
- Spouses: Ruth Elaine VanDemark (m. 1967; died 2012) Marilyn Vogel (m. 2013)
- Children: 2, including Amie Wilkinson
- Relatives: Alec Wilkinson (brother)
- Scientific career
- Workplaces: University of Illinois at Chicago; Northwestern University; SPSS; SYSTAT Software Inc.; Skytree, Inc.; Tableau Software; H2O.ai
- Thesis: The effect of involvement on similarity and preference structures (1975)

Leland Wilkinson (November 5, 1944 – December 10, 2021) was an American statistician and computer scientist at H2O.ai and adjunct professor of computer science at University of Illinois at Chicago. Wilkinson developed the SYSTAT statistical package in the early 1980s, sold it to SPSS in 1995, and worked at SPSS for 10 years recruiting and managing the visualization team. He left SPSS in 2008 and became executive VP of SYSTAT Software Inc. in Chicago. He then served as the VP of data visualization at Skytree, Inc and VP of statistics at Tableau Software before joining H2O.ai. His research focused on scientific visualization and statistical graphics. In these communities he was well known for his book The Grammar of Graphics, which was the foundation for the R package ggplot2.

== Early life ==
Wilkinson was born on November 5, 1944, to Kirk C. Wilkinson, an art editor of Woman's Day magazine. He is the brother of Alec Wilkinson, a writer for The New Yorker. He graduated from the Trinity-Pawling School in Pawling, New York.

Wilkinson received a Bachelor of Arts from Harvard University in 1966, a Bachelor of Sacred Theology from Harvard Divinity School in 1969, and a Ph.D. in psychology from Yale University in 1975. His thesis was titled The effect of involvement on similarity and preference structures.

== Career ==
=== Academic career ===
While attending Yale between 1974 and 1976, he served as an instructor of psychology. He became an assistant professor of psychology at University of Illinois at Chicago (UIC) in 1976 and was promoted to associate professor in 1980. In 1991, he became an adjunct professor of statistics at Northwestern University. He remained in that role until 2010. He rejoined UIC in 2007 as an adjunct professor of computer science.

Wilkinson was recognized as the primary author of the 1999 American Psychological Association's guidelines for statistical methods in psychology journals.

=== Professional career ===
Wilkinson wrote SYSTAT, a statistical software package, in the early 1980s. This program was noted for its comprehensive graphics, including the first software implementation of the heatmap display now widely used among biologists. After his company grew to 50 employees, he sold it to SPSS in 1995. At SPSS, he assembled a team of graphics programmers who developed the nViZn platform that produces the visualizations in SPSS, Clementine, and other analytics products. The nViZn platform was modeled after Wilkinson's 1999 book on statistical graphics, The Grammar of Graphics. This book also served as the foundation for the R package ggplot2, the Python Bokeh package, the R package ggbio, the Vega declarative language, and helped shape the Polaris project at Stanford University.

Wilkinson served as the vice president of statistics at Tableau Software, where he continued to work on scientific visualization and statistical graphics. In 2016, he became a chief scientist at H2O.ai to lead a data visualization push; he remained in that role until his death in 2021.

== Personal life ==
Wilkinson married Reverend Ruth Elaine VanDemark on June 23, 1967. She died in 2012. Together, they were the parents of Amie Wilkinson, a professor of mathematics at University of Chicago, and Caroline Wilkinson, a writer. He later married Marilyn Vogel.

Wilkinson died on December 10, 2021, at Northwestern Lake Forest Hospital, in Lake Forest, Illinois.

== Awards ==
Wilkinson became a Fellow of the American Statistical Association in 1998 and a Fellow of the American Association for the Advancement of Science in 2009. He was an elected member of the International Statistical Institute in 2006. Wilkinson received the National Institute of Statistical Sciences Distinguished Service Award in 2010.
