= Tableau Software =

American data visualization software company

Tableau Software, LLC

- Screenshot of Tableau Desktop Public Edition 2025, one of the company's pinnacle products.
- Type: Subsidiary
- Traded as: NYSE: DATA (2013–2019)
- Industry: Software
- Founded: 2003; 23 years ago, in Mountain View, California, U.S.
- Founders: Christian Chabot; Chris Stolte; Andrew Beers; Pat Hanrahan
- Successor: Salesforce
- Headquarters: Seattle, Washington, U.S.
- Key people: Christian Chabot (Chairman)
- Products: Business intelligence; Data visualization; Analytics
- Revenue: ▲US$1.16 billion (2018)
- Operating income: ▲ −US$90 million (2018)
- Net income: ▲ −US$77 million (2018)
- Total assets: ▲US$1.63 billion (2018)
- Total equity: ▲US$1.01 billion (2018)
- Number of employees: 4,181 (2018)
- Parent: Salesforce
- Website: tableau.com

Tableau Software, LLC is an American interactive data visualization software company focused on business intelligence. It was founded in 2003 in Mountain View, California, and is headquartered in Seattle, Washington.

The company's founders, Christian Chabot, Pat Hanrahan and Chris Stolte, were researchers at the Department of Computer Science at Stanford University. They specialized in visualization techniques for exploring and analyzing relational databases and data cubes, and started the company as a commercial outlet for research at Stanford from 1999 to 2002. In 2019, the company was acquired by Salesforce for $15.7 billion. At the time, this was the largest acquisition by Salesforce since its foundation.

Tableau products query relational databases, online analytical processing cubes, cloud databases, and spreadsheets to generate graph-type data visualizations. The software can also extract, store, and retrieve data from an in-memory data engine.

== Software products ==
Tableau products include:

- Tableau Desktop
- Tableau Server
- Tableau Prep Builder (released in 2018)
- Tableau Vizable (consumer data visualization mobile app released in 2015)
- Tableau Public (free to use)
- Tableau Reader (free to use)
- Tableau Mobile
- Tableau Cloud
- Tableau Prep
- Tableau CRM
- Tableau Bridge
- Tableau Pulse

== Functionalities ==
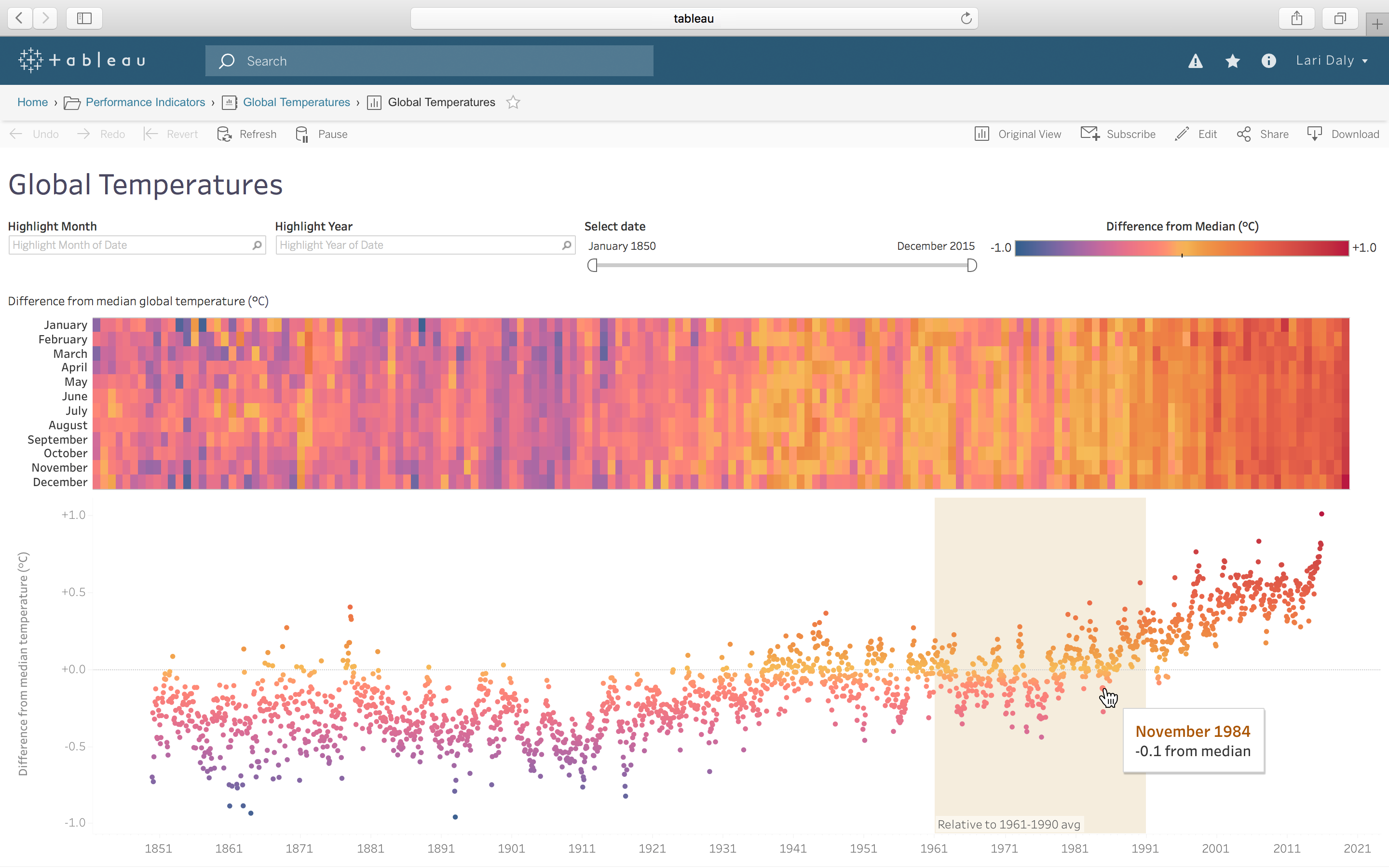
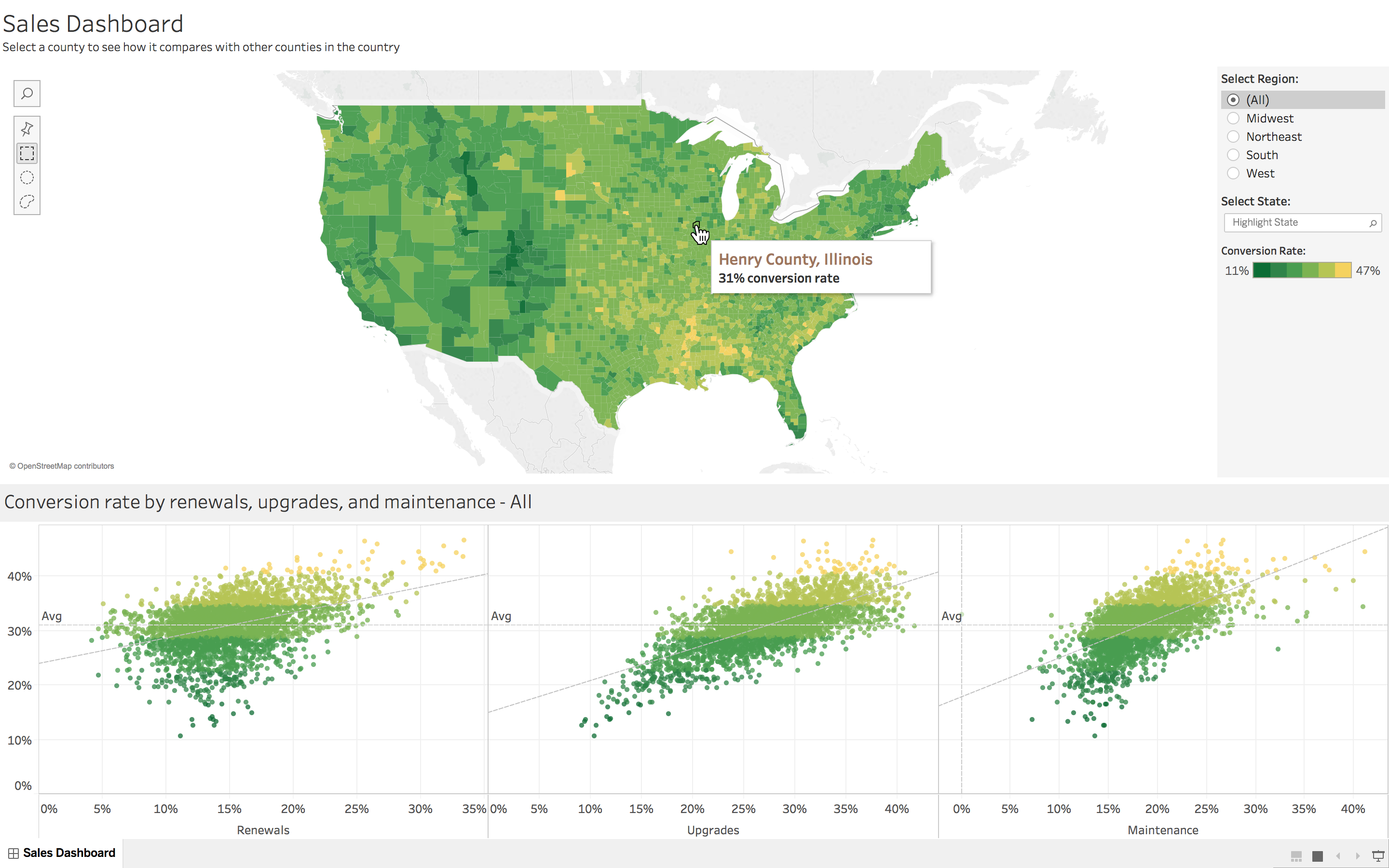
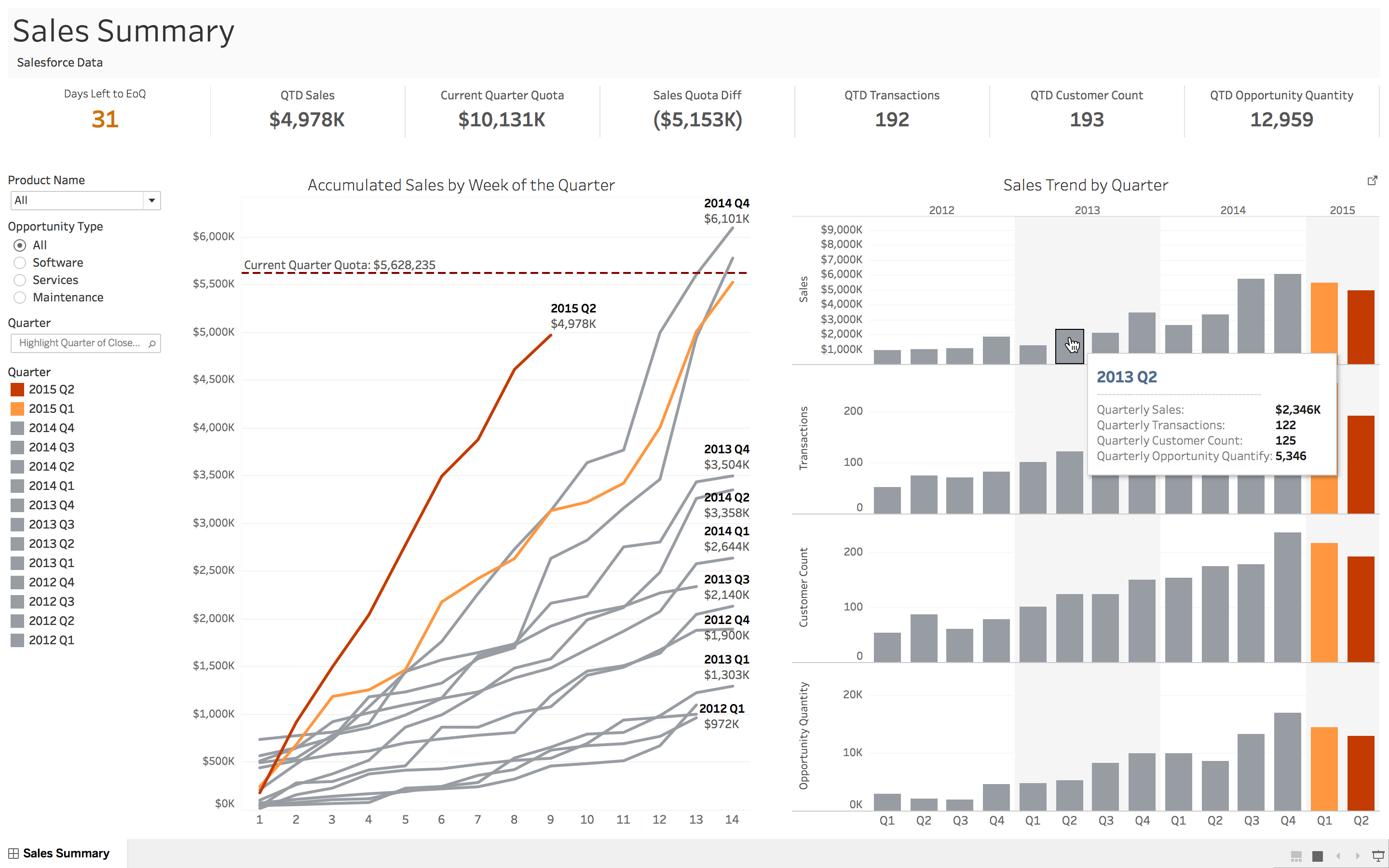
Some visualizations created by Tableau Software

Tableau offers drag and drop and other features such as multiple chart formats and mapping capabilities.

=== Map functionalities ===
The software is able to plot latitude and longitude coordinates and connect to spatial files like Esri Shapefiles, KML, and GeoJSON to display custom geography. The built-in geo-coding allows for administrative places (country, state/province, county/district), postal codes, US Congressional Districts, US CBSA/MSA, Area Codes, Airports, and European Union statistical areas (NUTS codes) to be mapped automatically. Geographies can be grouped to create custom territories or custom geocoding used to extend existing geographic roles in the product.

=== Data sources ===
Tableau Software can connect to data sources such as regular text files (.txt, .csv), Microsoft Excel (.xlsx), Microsoft Access (.accdb), import from Tableau workbook (.tbm), Oracle Database, Tableau Table data Extract (.tds) and many other types. It also allows to connect to data using multiple pre-built connectors.

Data type

Tableau automatically detects data types and fields. Tableau will make use of the data type that the data source has defined if it exists, or it will choose a data type if the data source does not specify one. In Tableau, the following data types are supported

- Text (string) Value
- Date Value
- Date and Time Value
- Numerical Value
- Geographic Values (Latitude and longitude used for maps)
- Boolean Values (True / False Conditions)
- Image role (used with image link URLs)
- Cluster Group (used with Find Clusters in Data)
- Timestamp

== History ==
While at Stanford, founders Hanrahan and Stolte, as well as Diane Tang, created the predecessor to Tableau, named Polaris; Polaris was a data visualization software tool, built with the support of a United States Department of Energy defense program, the Accelerated Strategic Computing Initiative (ASCI). ASCI was formed to facilitate the simulation and modeling of nuclear weapons.

Tableau was formally founded in January 2003 by Pat Hanrahan, Christian Chabot, and Chris Stolte, and moved its headquarters to the Fremont neighborhood of Seattle, Washington, the following year. The company has since expanded its Fremont headquarters and announced plans in 2016 for an auxiliary campus in suburban Kirkland, Washington. A new headquarters building opened near Gas Works Park in Wallingford in March 2017 and was followed by a new building in Fremont that opened in 2018.

In August 2016, Tableau announced the appointment of Adam Selipsky as president and CEO, effective September 16, 2016, replacing co-founder Christian Chabot as CEO.

In June 2018, Tableau acquired Empirical Systems, a Cambridge, Massachusetts based artificial intelligence startup, with plans to integrate the company's technology into the Tableau platform. Tableau also announced plans to establish an office in Cambridge as a result of the deal.

On June 10, 2019, Tableau was acquired by Salesforce in an all-stock deal worth $15.7 billion, being the largest acquisition in Salesforce's history at the time.

In March 2021, Tableau announced the appointment of Mark Nelson as president and CEO, replacing Adam Selipsky. In 2023, longtime Salesforce exec Ryan Aytay became CEO. Aytay stepped down from his role in 2026.

Notable Tableau employees include Jock Mackinlay and computer scientist and author Leland Wilkinson.

== Finances ==
On May 17, 2013, Tableau launched an initial public offering on the New York Stock Exchange, raising more than $250 million. Prior to its IPO, Tableau raised over $45 million in venture capital investment from investors such as the NEA and Meritech.

Tableau's revenue grew significantly from 2010 through 2013, reporting $34.2 million in 2010, $62.4 million in 2011, $127.7 million in 2012, and $232.44 million in 2013. Profit from 2010 to 2012 was $2.7 million, $3.4 million, and $1.6 million, respectively.

== WikiLeaks and policy changes ==
On December 2, 2010, Tableau deleted WikiLeaks' visualizations about the United States diplomatic cables leak, stating it was due to direct political pressure from US Senator Joe Lieberman.

On February 21, 2011, Tableau posted an updated data policy. The accompanying blog post cited the two main changes as (1) creating a formal complaint process and (2) using freedom of speech as a guiding principle. In addition, the post announced the creation of an advisory board to help the company navigate future situations that "push the boundaries" of the policy. Tableau likened the new policy to the model set forth in the Digital Millennium Copyright Act, and opined that under the new policy, Wikileaks' visuals would not have been removed, as "the underlying data were statistics about the cables, not the cables themselves".
