= Java GUI for R =

JGR
- Developer(s): Markus Helbig, Simon Urbanek, Ian Fellows
- Stable release: 1.8-4 / September 24, 2017
- Operating system: Cross-Platform
- Platform: R programming language
- Type: Statistical software
- License: GNU General Public License
- Website: http://rforge.net/JGR/

JGR (pronounced 'Jaguar') is a universal and unified graphical user interface for the R programming language, licensed under the GNU General Public License.

JGR is a cross-platform stand-alone R terminal, and can be used as a more advanced substitute to the default Rgui (on Windows) or to a simple R session started from a terminal. It provides a friendly R-console complemented by a spreadsheet-like data editor and by a script editor featuring syntax highlighting, autocompletion and (MS Excel-style) arguments-suggestions for entered functions, and direct command transfer.

== See also ==
- R interfaces
