= RStudio =

Integrated development environment for R

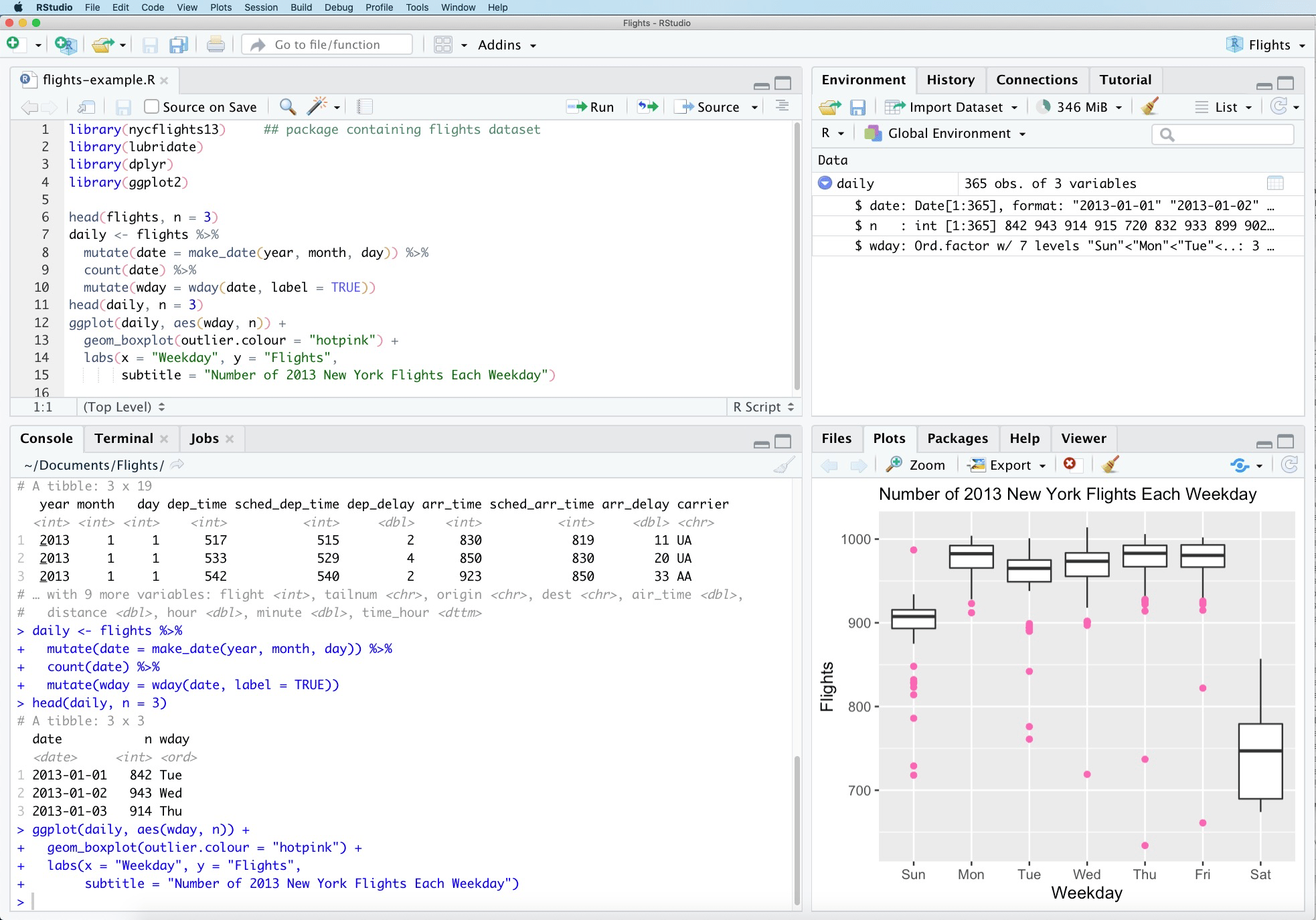
- RStudio Version 1.4.1564 on MacOS 10.15.7
- Developer: Posit PBC
- Release: 28 February 2011; 15 years ago
- Stable release: 2025.09.2 / 30 October 2025; 11 months ago
- Written in: Java, C++, JavaScript
- Operating system: Ubuntu, Fedora, Red Hat Linux, openSUSE, macOS, Windows NT
- Platform: IA-32, x86-64; Electron
- License: GNU Affero General Public License v3
- Website: posit.co/products/open-source/rstudio
- Repository: github.com/rstudio/rstudio

RStudio IDE (or RStudio) is an integrated development environment for R, a programming language for statistical computing and graphics. It is available in two formats: RStudio Desktop, a regular desktop application, and RStudio Server, which runs on a remote server and allows accessing RStudio using a web browser. The RStudio IDE is a product of Posit PBC (formerly RStudio PBC, formerly RStudio Inc.).

== Reproducible analyses with vignettes ==
A strength of RStudio is its support for reproducible analyses with R Markdown vignettes. These allow users to mix text with code in R, Python, Julia, shell scripts, SQL, Stan, JavaScript, C, C++, Fortran, and others, similar to Jupyter Notebooks. R Markdown can be used to create dynamic reports that are automatically updated when new data become available. These reports can also be exported in various formats, including HTML, PDF, Microsoft Word, and LaTeX, with templates specific to the requirements of many scientific journals.

R Markdown vignettes and Jupyter notebooks make the data analysis completely reproducible. R Markdown vignettes have been included as appendices with tutorials on Wikiversity.

In 2022, Posit announced an R Markdown-like publishing system called Quarto. In addition to combining results of R, code and results using Python, Julia, Observable JavaScript, and Jupyter notebooks can also be used in Quarto documents. Compared to the file extension .Rmd that R Markdown has, Quarto documents have the file extension .qmd.

One difference between R Markdown files and Quarto documents is defining options in code chunks. In R Markdown, they would be inline within the curly brackets.

```{r chunk_name, echo=FALSE, warning=FALSE}
print(42)
```

In contrast, Quarto documents define the chunk options below the curly brackets, prefixed using a pound character and vertical pipe (or "hash-pipe").

```{r}
#| label: chunk_name
#| echo: false
#| warning: false
print(42)
```

== Licensing model ==
The RStudio integrated development environment (IDE) is available with the GNU Affero General Public License version 3. The AGPL v3 is an open source license that guarantees the freedom to share the code.

RStudio Desktop and RStudio Server are both available in free and fee-based (commercial) editions. OS support depends on the format/edition of the IDE. Prepackaged distributions of RStudio Desktop are available for Windows, macOS, and Linux. RStudio Server and Server Pro run on Debian, Ubuntu, Red Hat Linux, CentOS, openSUSE and SLES.

== Overview and history ==
The RStudio IDE was partly written in the C++ programming language and uses the Qt framework for its graphical user interface. Since 2022.12.0+353 version, it switched to the Electron framework. The bigger percentage of the code is written in Java. JavaScript is also used.

Work on the RStudio IDE started around December 2010, and the first public beta version (v0.92) was officially announced in February 2011. Version 1.0 was released on 1 November 2016. Version 1.1 was released on 9 October 2017.

== Addins ==
The RStudio IDE provides a mechanism for executing R functions interactively from within the IDE through the Addins menu. This enables packages to include graphical user interfaces (GUIs) for increased accessibility. Popular R packages that use this feature include:

- bookdown – a knitr extension to create books
- colourpicker – a graphical tool to pick colours for plots
- datasets.load – a graphical tool to search and load datasets
- googleAuthR – Authenticate with Google APIs

== Development ==
The RStudio IDE is developed by Posit, PBC, a public-benefit corporation founded by J. J. Allaire, creator of the programming language ColdFusion. Posit has no formal connection to the R Foundation, a not-for-profit organization located in Vienna, Austria, which is responsible for overseeing development of the R environment for statistical computing. Posit was formerly known as RStudio Inc. In July 2022, it announced that it changed its name to Posit, to signify its broadening exploration towards other programming languages such as Python.

== See also ==
- R interfaces
- Comparison of integrated development environments
