= PeakFit =

PeakFit(now PeakLab)
- Developers: AIST Software, Inc.
- Stable release: 4.1.2 / 2007
- Operating system: Windows
- Type: nonlinear peak separation and analysis software
- License: proprietary
- Website: r2nsoftware.com

PeakFit(now PeakLab) is an automated nonlinear peak separation and analysis software package for scientists performing spectroscopy, chromatography and electrophoresis.

PeakFit automatically finds and fits up to 100 peaks to a data set, at a time, enabling users to characterize peaks and find the best equation that fits their data. It can also enhance the data obtained from traditional numerical methods and lab instruments.

PeakFit was originally developed by Ronald Eugene Brown of AISN Software and distributed by Jandel Scientific Software in the late 1980s but by January 2004, Systat Software acquired the exclusive worldwide rights from SPSS Inc. to distribute SigmaPlot and other Sigma Series products.
