= R Foundation for Statistical Computing =

Organization supporting the R Project

- Formation: April 2003; 23 years ago
- Type: Non-profit organization
- Legal status: Active
- Purpose: Support for the R Project and innovations in statistical computing
- Headquarters: Vienna, Austria
- Coordinates: 48.2325°N 16.3571°E
- President: Simon Urbanek
- Key people: Robert Gentleman; Ross Ihaka; Peter Dalgaard; Friedrich Leisch
- Affiliations: R Core Team
- Website: www.r-project.org/foundation/
- Remarks: Founded by members of the R Development Core Team

The R Foundation for Statistical Computing is a non-profit organization based in Vienna, Austria, that provides legal and financial support for the R Project. Established in April 2003, it serves as the primary body for holding the intellectual property of the R software environment and for coordinating its global community.

== Purpose and activities ==
The Foundation was created to provide a stable, long-term framework for the development of R, a language and environment for statistical computing and graphics. Its primary goals include safeguarding the project's independence and ensuring the software remains available under open-source licenses.

The Foundation's core activities include:

- Intellectual property management: holding and administering the copyright for the R software and documentation, typically under the GNU General Public License (GPL).
- Community coordination: organizing the annual useR! conference, the premier international gathering for R users and developers.
- Scientific communication: publishing The R Journal, a peer-reviewed, open-access journal that features research on the development and application of R software.
- Financial stewardship: receiving and managing donations and membership fees from individuals and corporate sponsors to fund development tasks and infrastructure.

== History ==
The R language was first developed by Ross Ihaka and Robert Gentleman at the University of Auckland in the early 1990s. As the user base grew globally, the R Development Core Team was formed in 1997 to maintain the source code.

In 2003, the Core Team members established the R Foundation as a formal legal entity in Austria to provide a centralized point of contact for commercial entities and to manage the project's growing financial needs.

== Governance ==
The Foundation is governed by a board of directors, which has historically consisted of members of the R Core Team. As of 2025, the board includes notable statisticians such as Peter Dalgaard, Kurt Hornik, and Martyn Plummer.

In 2015, the R Foundation became a founding member of the R Consortium, a separate project under the Linux Foundation designed to provide a mechanism for corporate entities to support the R ecosystem through funding for infrastructure and technical projects. The consortium serves as a vehicle for corporate entities (including Google, Microsoft, and Posit PBC) to provide financial support to the R ecosystem. The R Foundation holds a permanent seat on the consortium's board of directors and its infrastructure steering committee to ensure that corporate-funded projects align with the core language's development goals.

== Membership, donations and funding ==
Funds managed by the foundation are primarily used to maintain the Comprehensive R Archive Network (CRAN), support the peer-reviewed R Journal, and provide the necessary server infrastructure for the R Project. Because the board and R core team serve as volunteers, the organization has low overhead, focusing expenditures on technical sustainability and community outreach.

The foundation's primary source of revenue is its tiered membership program, which is structured for individuals, institutions, and benefactors who wish to support the development of R on a recurring basis. In addition to memberships, the foundation accepts donations. Revenue is also generated from the annual useR! conference, where registration fees and event sponsorships are used to fund future community activities and development tasks.

To address long-term sustainability and infrastructure modernization, the R Foundation has increasingly pursued large-scale external grants. In October 2025, it was announced that the German Sovereign Tech Fund had begun providing significant financial backing to the R Foundation. This funding is specifically earmarked for replacing legacy code, improving core maintainability, fortifying (through binary and source code signing) the software supply chain, and enhancing documentation to lower the barrier for new contributors.

== See also ==
- Comparison of statistical packages
- Comprehensive R Archive Network (CRAN)
- Free Software Foundation
