= John Fox (sociologist) =

American-Canadian sociologist and social statistician

- Born: 1947; New York City
- Died: November 26, 2025
- Citizenship: American, Canadian
- Title: Professor Emeritus; Senator William McMaster Professor of Social Statistics
- Awards: Elected Member of the R Foundation for Statistical Computing

Academic background
- Education: City College of New York (BA); University of Michigan (PhD)
- Thesis: Behavior In Pure Conflict Of Interest Situations: Experimental Studies Of Two-person, Zerosum Games
- Doctoral advisor: William A. Gamson

Academic work
- Discipline: Sociology, Social Statistics
- Institutions: McMaster University; York University; University of Alberta
- Doctoral students: William K. Carroll
- Notable works: R Commander (Rcmdr); Applied Regression Analysis and Generalized Linear Models; An R Companion to Applied Regression
- Website: www.john-fox.ca

John David Fox (1947 – November 2025) was an American-Canadian sociologist and statistician. He was professor emeritus and the former Senator William McMaster Professor of Social Statistics at McMaster University.

Fox was a pivotal figure in the R programming community, recognized for developing the R Commander (Rcmdr) graphical user interface and authoring the widely used "car" (Companion to Applied Regression) and "effects" software packages. His textbooks on regression analysis and statistical computing are considered foundational in the quantitative social sciences, with his work garnering over 110,000 citations.

== Early life and education ==
Fox was born in 1947 in New York City. He attended Brooklyn Technical High School and initially studied engineering at the City College of New York (CCNY) before switching to sociology. He graduated from CCNY with a Bachelor of Arts in 1968. He subsequently attended the University of Michigan, where he earned his PhD in sociology under the supervision of William A. Gamson in 1972, specializing in social psychology and demography.

== Academic career ==
Fox began his teaching career at the University of Alberta and York University in Toronto, where he served as Professor of Sociology, and of Mathematics and Statistics. At York, he also coordinated the Statistical Consulting Service at the Institute for Social Research.

In 1990, he joined the Department of Sociology at McMaster University. He was later appointed the Senator William McMaster Professor of Social Statistics, a position he held until his retirement. Throughout his career, Fox was a frequent instructor at the Inter-university Consortium for Political and Social Research (ICPSR) Summer Program at the University of Michigan, teaching quantitative methods to generations of researchers.

== Statistical software and the R Project ==
Fox was an elected member of the R Foundation for Statistical Computing and a significant contributor to the development of the R ecosystem. He developed R Commander (Rcmdr), a cross-platform GUI designed to make R accessible to students and non-programmers by providing point-and-click functionality for complex statistical analyses.

He was the author or co-author of several influential R packages, including:

- "car" (Companion to Applied Regression): tools for regression diagnostics and model building.
- "effects": for visualizing the results of linear models and generalized linear models.
- "ivreg": for instrumental variables estimation.
- "matlib": for matrix algebra and the teaching of linear algebra.

== Death ==
His death was announced by the R Foundation in late November, 2025.

== Selected publications ==
- Fox, J. (2016). Applied Regression Analysis and Generalized Linear Models (3rd ed.). SAGE Publications. ISBN 978-1452205663
- Fox, J., & Weisberg, S. (2019). An R Companion to Applied Regression (3rd ed.). SAGE Publications. ISBN 978-1544336480
- Fox, J. (2017). Using the R Commander: A Point-and-Click Interface for R. Chapman and Hall/CRC. ISBN 978-1498732505
