= Margaret Hyland =

New Zealand chemist and professor

Margaret Mary Hyland FRSNZ
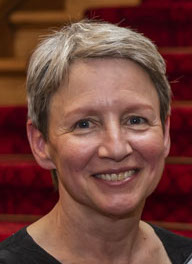
- Born: 1960 (age 65–66)
- Education: University of Western Ontario
- Scientific career
- Fields: Chemistry
- Workplaces: University of Auckland
- Thesis: X-ray Photoelectron Spectroscopic Studies Of The Interaction Of Aqueous Metal Complexes With Sulphide Minerals (1989)

Margaret Mary Hyland FRSNZ is a Canadian-born chemist based in New Zealand whose research focuses on aluminium technology, and the chemistry and engineering of material surfaces. She moved to New Zealand in 1989 and after holding many senior academic leadership roles supporting and developing research at the faculty, university and national level became recognised as an authority on the generation and capture of fluoride emissions from aluminium smelters and for coordinating the team that produced the 'Fluoride Emissions Management Guide' for the aluminium industry. This achievement was acknowledged when she became the first woman to win the Pickering Medal. In 2017, Hyland was seconded to the Ministry of Business, Innovation and Employment in the role of Chief Scientist and has held positions in a variety of other groups supporting the physical sciences and engineering. She was Vice-Provost, (Research) at Victoria University of Wellington, New Zealand from 2018 until 2025.

== Education ==
Hyland graduated from University of Guelph, Ontario Canada in 1983 with a BSc (Hons) in Chemistry, and completed her PhD at the University of Western Ontario in 1989. The thesis for her PhD, titled 'X-ray Photoelectron Spectroscopic Studies Of The Interaction Of Aqueous Metal Complexes With Sulphide Minerals', looked at how "gold and other metals are laid down on minerals surfaces, with implications for capturing heavy metals in the environment, and involved a technique called the chemical surface analysis".

== Academic career ==
When the University of Auckland acquired its first surface analysis equipment in 1989, Hyland moved to New Zealand and took up a position as a professor of Chemical and Materials Engineering and continued in this role until 2018. She was Associate Deputy Vice-Chancellor, Research (2010 – 2013), and between 2012 and 2017, Deputy Dean, Faculty of Engineering. In her time at the University of Auckland, Hyland led a range of strategic postgraduate and research projects.

From August 2018 Hyland has been Vice-Provost (Research) at Victoria University of Wellington, and as a member of the Senior Leadership Team, is responsible for developing strategic research objectives that build capability and strengthen understanding of matauranga Maori.

== Fluoride emissions management ==
While at Auckland University, Hyland became the founding principal investigator and associate director of the university's Light Metals Research Centre (LMRC). This allowed consolidation of her research into developing fluoride gas cleaning systems for the aluminium industry, and resulted in findings that were used at the Tiwai Point Aluminium Smelter for the design of their gas cleaning system, the Torbed Reactor. The research also contributed key information toward the development of the industry guide to minimise fluoride emissions. In 2011, Professor Hyland and her team produced the first comprehensive and practical guide to fluoride emissions management which has allowed smelters worldwide to reduce fluoride emissions. Research for this guide directed by Hyland was acknowledged as having a "profound impact on how environmental mitigation measures and emission control systems are developed and applied to the primary aluminium industry."

== Responses to public issues ==
When a paper by Professor Anne-Marie Brady of the University of Canterbury, presented as a supplementary submission to Parliament's justice select committee in 2020 claimed New Zealand universities had links to Chinese universities and could be assisting technology transfer useful to the Chinese military, Hyland as one of many academic leaders who disputed this, said that "Victoria University had stringent measures to ensure work undertaken by the university's staff and researchers complied with New Zealand's legal and compliance frameworks... where some of our potentially sensitive technology areas are concerned, due diligence informs our decisions to work with partner organisations – this holds true in regard to the Chinese organisations named in the article. She concluded: "There are many universities and organisations based in China, which are conducting high-quality, non-military research and, along with other research institutions, we are working to partner with some of these organisations, with the knowledge that the research will be used in safe and appropriate ways."

In February 2021, when the New Zealand Herald noted the considerably reduced number of PhD students coming from overseas because of border restrictions due to the Government's response to COVID-19, Hyland said that this would have a major impact across the entire university system and that "PhDs are an incredibly important part of our research workforce...[and]... a drop in enrolments would also affect research projects run in collaboration with private bodies and Crown research institutes."

== Invited positions and distinctions ==
- Science for Technological Innovation National Science Challenge (SfTI). Hyland was appointed as the inauragual director of this initiative which brought together 13 research organisations and over 100 researchers to "enhance New Zealand's capacity to use physical sciences and engineering for economic growth." At her farewell on 26 February 2017, SfTI management presented Hyland with a pounamu blessed by Dr Te Taka Keegan, who said it was important that she received a "Māori taonga in appreciation of her support and recognition of the importance of Māori aspirations in the Challenge."
- Ministry of Business, Innovation and Employment (MBIE). Hyland was seconded to MBIE in 2017 as a Chief Scientist in 2017, a role in which she provided "science leadership and helped to develop national research, science and innovation strategies and policies and support their implementation."
- Eureka Trust Board. In 2018, Hyland was appointed as a Trustee to this organisation which aims to develop young leaders in the areas of science, technology, engineering or mathematics, who will bring about the vision of Sir Paul Callaghan to make "New Zealand, the most beautiful, stimulating and exciting place in the world in which to live."
- Karori Sanctuary Trust. Hyland has been a trustee since 2023. The Karori Sanctuary Trust are the managers of Zealandia Te Māra a Tāne in Karori, Wellington.

== Awards and honours ==
- Hyland was jointly awarded the Light Metals Award in 2005 for co-authoring a paper Alumina Structural Hydroxyl as a Continuous Source of HF, a chapter in the publication: Light Metals (2004).
- In 2015, Hyland won the Pickering Medal from the Royal Society of New Zealand, 'for her pioneering work into the reduction of fluoride emissions produced by aluminium smelters worldwide.'
- In 2017, Hyland was selected as one of the Royal Society Te Apārangi's "150 women in 150 words", celebrating the contributions of women to knowledge in New Zealand. She was elected a Fellow of the Royal Society Te Apārangi in 2018.

== Selected works ==
- Hyland, Margaret M.; Bancroft, G.Michael (1989). "An XPS study of gold deposition at low temperatures on sulphide minerals: Reducing agents". Geochimica et Cosmochimica Acta. 53 (2): 367–372. Bibcode:1989GeCoA..53..367H. doi:10.1016/0016-7037(89)90388-8.
- Jacobs, L.; Hyland, M.M.; De Bonte, M. (1998). "Comparative Study of WC-Cermet Coatings Sprayed via the HVOF and the HVAF Process". Journal of Thermal Spray Technology. 7 (2): 213–218. Bibcode:1998JTST....7..213J. doi:10.1361/105996398770350954. S2CID 135552046.
- Jacobs, L.; Hyland, M.M.; De Bonte, M. (1999). "Study of the Influence of Microstructural Properties on the Sliding-Wear Behavior of HVOF and HVAF Sprayed WC-Cermet Coatings". Journal of Thermal Spray Technology. 8 (1): 125–132. Bibcode:1999JTST....8..125J. doi:10.1361/105996399770350656. S2CID 136004386.
- Hyland, M.M; Jean, G.E; Bancroft, G.M (1990). "XPS and AES studies of Hg(II) sorption and desorption reactions on sulphide minerals". Geochimica et Cosmochimica Acta. 54 (7): 1957–1967. Bibcode:1990GeCoA..54.1957H. doi:10.1016/0016-7037(90)90264-L.
- Bancroft, G. M.; Hyland, M. M. (1990). "Chapter 13. Spectroscopic Studies of Adsorption/Reduction Reactions of Aqueous Metal Complexes on Sulphide Surfaces". Mineral-Water Interface Geochemistry. pp. 511–558. doi:10.1515/9781501509131-017. ISBN 9781501509131.
