= The R Journal =

- Discipline: Statistical computing
- Language: English
- Edited by: Emi Tanaka

Publication details
- History: 2009–present
- Publisher: R Foundation for Statistical Computing (Austria)
- Frequency: Quarterly
- Open access: Yes
- License: CC BY 4.0
- Impact factor: 2.3 (2023)

Standard abbreviations
- ISO 4: R J.

Indexing
- ISSN: 2073-4859
- OCLC no.: 920403881

Links
- Journal homepage

The R Journal is a peer-reviewed open-access scientific journal published by the R Foundation for Statistical Computing since 2009. It publishes research articles in statistical computing that are of interest to users of the R programming language. The journal includes a News and Notes section that supersedes the R News newsletter, which was published from 2001 to 2008.

The journal serves a dual role as a research journal in statistical computing and as the official newsletter of the R Project. It publishes regular news updates about The R Foundation, the CRAN repository system, and the Bioconductor project. It also published articles foreshadowing new development directions for R.

The journal also publishes articles on best-practice and innovation in modelling, for example in multivariate statistics or multi-level modelling. A feature of the journal is the inclusion in articles of complete code by which readers can reproduce results and examples.

== Abstracting and indexing ==
The journal is indexed in the Science Citation Index Expanded. According to the Journal Citation Reports, the journal has a 2023 impact factor of 2.3.

== Editors-in-chief ==
The following persons are or have been editors-in-chief: Vince Carey (2009), Peter Dalgaard (2010), Heather Turner (2011), Martyn Plummer (2012), Hadley Wickham (2013), Deepayan Sarkar (2014), Bettina Grün (2015), Michael Lawrence (2016), Roger Bivand (2017), John Verzani (2018), Norman Matloff (2019), Michael Kane (2020), Dianne Cook (2021), Catherine Hurley (2022), Simon Urbanek (2023), Mark van der Loo (2024), Rob J. Hyndman (2025), and Emi Tanaka (2026).
