= R Commander =

Graphical user interface for the R programming language

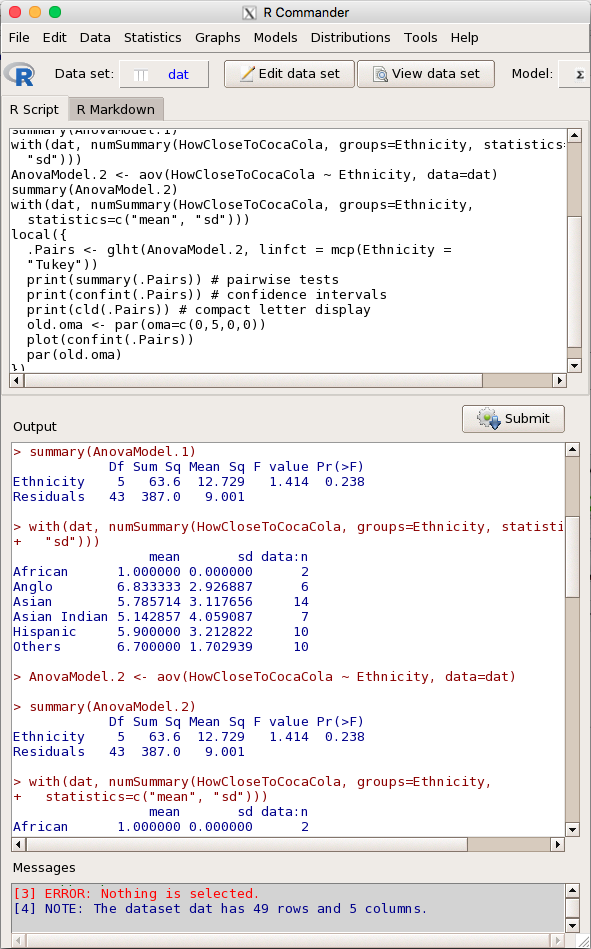
- R commander running ANOVA
- Developer: John Fox et al.
- Stable release: 2.15.0 / September 25, 2026
- Operating system: Cross-Platform
- Platform: R programming language
- Type: Statistical software
- License: GNU General Public License

R Commander (Rcmdr) is a GUI for the R programming language, licensed under the GNU General Public License, and initially developed by John Fox in the sociology department at McMaster University. Following his passing in November 2025, maintenance and development transitioned to a new team. Rcmdr looks and works similarly to the SPSS GUI by providing a menu of analytic and graphical methods. It also displays the underlying R code that runs each analysis.

Rcmdr can be installed from within R, like any R package. Integration with Microsoft Excel is provided by the RExcel package, which also provides an RAndFriendsLight "bundle" graphical installer. R commander is used as a suggested learning environment for a number of R-centric academic statistics books for students and scientists.

== See also ==
- Comparison of statistical packages
- R interfaces
