= Roger Bivand =

British geographer and economist

- Born: Roger Simon Bivand; 5 April 1951 (age 75); Bristol, England
- Citizenship: British
- Education: University of Cambridge (BA); London School of Economics (PhD)
- Known for: Development of R spatial packages (sp, rgdal, sf); Applied Spatial Data Analysis with R
- Awards: OpenGeoHub Lifetime Achievement Award (2018)
- Scientific career
- Fields: Economic geography, Spatial econometrics, Open-source software
- Workplaces: Norwegian School of Economics; Adam Mickiewicz University in Poznań
- Doctoral advisor: Dan J. Sinclair
- Website: www.nhh.no/en/employees/faculty/roger-bivand/

Notes
- Professor Emeritus at the Norwegian School of Economics.

Roger Simon Bivand (born 5 April 1951) is a British geographer, economist and professor at the Norwegian School of Economics. He specialises in open source software for spatial analysis, and played a major role in developing functions for spatial data in the R statistical programming language, including the R packages sp, rgdal, maptools and rgrass7. His book Applied Spatial Data Analysis with R (2008), coauthored with Edzer Pebesma and Virgilio Gómez-Rubio, is considered "the authoritative resource on R's spatial capabilities".

== Education and career ==
Bivand was born in Bristol on 5 April 1951. He studied geography at the University of Cambridge and obtained his PhD from the London School of Economics in 1975, with a thesis on the economic geography of Sogn og Fjordane in Norway. He went on to receive a habilitation from the Adam Mickiewicz University in Poznań in 1982.

Bivand joined the Norwegian School of Economics in 1988 and was appointed a professor in 1996. In 1991-92 he was the director of the Business School (MBA studies) of the Warsaw University of Technology (Poland). He has been an editor of several academic journals, including the Journal of Statistical Software, The R Journal, the Journal of Geographical Systems, Geographical Analysis and the Norwegian Journal of Geography. In 2018 he received a Lifetime Achievement Award from the OpenGeoHub Foundation.

== Selected publications ==
- Bivand, Roger; Pebesma, Edzer; Gómez-Rubio, Virgilio (2013). Applied Spatial Data Analysis with R (2nd ed.). New York, NY: Springer. ISBN 978-1-4614-7618-4.
