= Emacs Speaks Statistics =

- GNU emacs in ESS and iESS mode. In the upper window, S code is edited in emacs' ESS mode. In the lower window the S code is executed by R via iESS.
- Stable release: 25.01.0
- Repository: github.com/emacs-ess/ESS.git
- Type: Cross-platform#Cross-platform development environments
- License: GPL
- Website: ess.r-project.org

Emacs Speaks Statistics (ESS) is an Emacs package for programming in statistical languages. It adds two types of modes to emacs:

1. ESS modes for editing statistical languages like R, SAS and Julia; and
2. inferior ESS (iESS) modes for interacting with statistical processes like R and SAS.

Modes of types (1) and (2) work seamlessly together. In addition, modes of type (1) provide the capability to submit a batch job for statistical packages like SAS, BUGS or JAGS when an interactive session is unwanted due to the potentially lengthy time required for the task to complete.

With Emacs Speaks Statistics, the user can conveniently edit statistical language commands in one emacs buffer, and execute the code in a second. There are a number of advantages of doing data analysis using Emacs/ESS in this way, rather than interacting with R, S-PLUS or other software directly. First, as indicated above, ESS provides a convenient way of writing and executing code without frequently switching between programs. This also encourages the good practice of keeping a record of one's data analysis, equivalent to working from do-files in Stata. Third, since emacs is also an able editor of LaTeX files, it facilitates the integration of data analysis and written text with Sweave.
