= Neuwirth =

Neuwirth is a German surname. Notable people with the surname include:

- Aleš Neuwirth (born 1985), Czech football player
- Allan Charles Neuwirth (born 1956), American screenwriter, producer, author, designer and cartoonist
- Angelika Neuwirth (born 1943), German professor of Quranic studies
- Anton Neuwirth (1921–2004), Slovak medical doctor, political prisoner, Member of Parliament, and ambassador
- Bebe Neuwirth (born 1958), American theater, television, and film actress
- Bob Neuwirth (1939–2022), American singer, songwriter, record producer and visual artist
- Chantal Neuwirth (born 1948), French actress
- Erich Neuwirth (born 1948), Austrian professor emeritus of statistics und computer science at the University of Vienna
- Gösta Neuwirth (born 1937), Austrian musicologist, composer and academic teacher
- Jessica Neuwirth (born 1961), American lawyer and women's rights activist
- Lucien Neuwirth (1924–2013), French advocate for the oral contraceptive pill, who defended the Neuwirth Law
- Michal Neuvirth (born 1988), Czech ice hockey player
- Olga Neuwirth (born 1968), Austrian composer
- Robert Neuwirth, American journalist and author
- Robert S. Neuwirth (1933–2013), American gynecologist
- Tassilo Neuwirth (born 1940), Austrian ice hockey player
- Tom Neuwirth (born 1988), Austrian singer and drag queen, better known as Conchita Wurst
- Yehoshua Neuwirth (1927–2013), Israeli rabbi
- Yvonne Neuwirth (born 1992), Austrian tennis player
