= William K. Carroll =

American sociologist (born 1952)

- Born: 1952 (age 73–74); United States

Academic background
- Education: Brock University; York University
- Thesis: Capital Accumulation and Corporate Interlocking in Post-war Canada
- Doctoral advisor: John Fox; Mike Orstein
- Influences: Antonio Gramsci

Academic work
- Discipline: Sociology
- Institutions: University of Victoria
- Main interests: Interlocking directorates; corporate power; political economy; social inequality; social movements; political sociology

William K. Carroll (born 1952), also known as Bill Carroll, is a professor of Sociology at the University of Victoria, British Columbia, Canada. He is known for his work on interlocking directorates, corporate power and social movements.

== Biography ==
William K. Carroll was born in 1952 close to Washington, DC. He immigrated to Canada with his family in 1968, where he attended Brock University in Niagara Falls, and then York University in Toronto. He obtained his PhD in sociology in 1981, and the same year accepted a position at the University of Victoria, where he still teaches.

He was a member of the Editorial Board for Journal of World-Systems Research.

== Research ==
Bill Carroll is considered a leading Canadian critical sociologist. His research on the political economy of corporate capitalism, social movements, social change, and critical social theory and method is informed by Marxist and post-Marxist theory, and especially the writings of Antonio Gramsci. Carroll produced major empirical work investigating the power and social organization of capitalist classes in Canada and transnationally. In parallel, he wrote extensively on Canadian and transnational social movements, with a focus on key institutions of knowledge production such as the media and alternative policy-planning groups. Over the years, his research has increasingly integrated environmental concerns, and his most recent project maps out the political power of the carbon extractive industry in Western Canada.

== Major works ==
- "Corporate Power and Canadian Capitalism." Vancouver: University of British Columbia Press, 1986. ISBN 978-0-7748-0246-8.
- "Corporate Power in a Globalizing World: A Study in Elite Social Organization." Don Mills (ON): Oxford University Press, 2004 (re-edited 2010). ISBN 978-0-19-543831-4.
- "Remaking Media: The Struggle to Democratize Public Communication" with Robert Hackett. London: Routledge, 2006. ISBN 978-0-415-39469-7.
- "The Making of a Transnational Capitalist Class: Corporate Power in the 21st Century." London and New York: Zed Books, 2010. ISBN 978-1-84813-443-0.
- "Expose, Oppose, Propose: Alternative Policy Groups and the Struggle for Global Justice." London: Zed Books, 2016. ISBN 978-1-78360-603-0.
- "A World to Win: Contemporary Social Movements and Counter-Hegemony" edited with Kanchan Sarker. Winnipeg: ARP Books, 2016. ISBN 978-1-894037-73-0.
