= Pickering Medal =

Science award in New Zealand

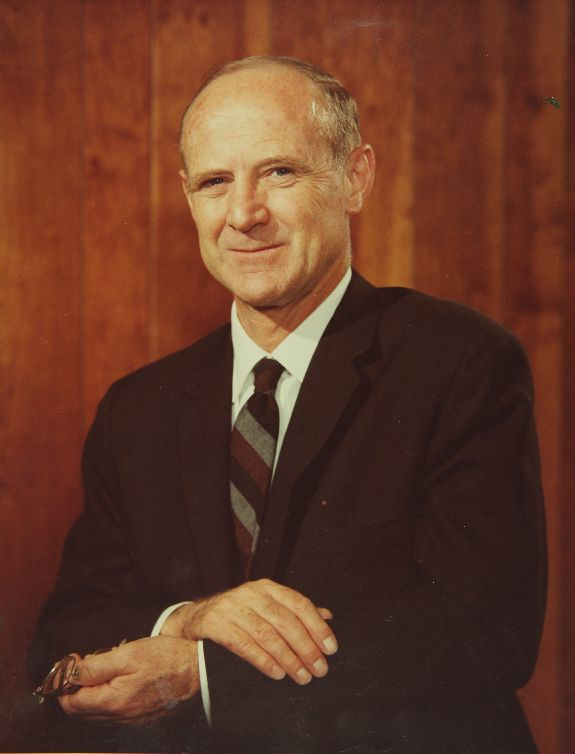
William Pickering

The Pickering Medal is awarded annually by the Royal Society Te Apārangi to a person or team "who, while in New Zealand, has through design, development or invention performed innovative work the results of which have been significant in their influence and recognition both nationally and internationally, or which have led to significant commercial success".

The award is named for Sir William (Bill) Pickering. The front of the medal features the head of Bill Pickering, with the words technology, innovation, excellence inscribed round the edge, while the obverse features the Royal Society coat of arms. Up until 2012, the medal was accompanied by a prize of $15,000.

== Recipients ==
| Year | Recipient(s) | Affiliation | Citation |
|---|---|---|---|
| 2004 | Robert Buckley | | |
| 2005 | John Boys | | |
| 2006 | Murray McEwan | | |
| 2007 | John McKinnon | | A wool chemist whose technological advancements have been adopted worldwide |
| 2008 | Ross Ihaka | | For his software package “R” that has revolutionised the practice of statistics with its unique open-source, extensible model |
| 2009 | Ken McNatty | | For his contribution to the field of reproductive biology, with products having been commercialised from his work |
| 2010 | Frank Griffin | | For his contribution to work in developing diagnostics tests for detecting two major bacterial diseases of New Zealand deer, and a vaccine for the prevention of Yersiniosis in deer |
| 2011 | David Ryan | | For developing technology which is at the heart of optimisation software used worldwide for solving complex logistics problems, such as airline scheduling |
| 2012 | David Williams | | For his contribution to the development of biomedical and gas sensors, which have been commercialised |
| 2013 | Harold Marshall | | For his research-based acoustical designs that have had a profound effect on the design of performance spaces for music, worldwide" |
| 2014 | Simon Malpas | | For his development and commercialisation of implantable wireless sensors that can monitor physiological processes such as heart activity or lung function in the body" |
| 2015 | Margaret Hyland | University of Auckland | For her pioneering work into the reduction of fluoride emissions produced by aluminium smelters worldwide |
| 2016 | Iain Anderson | | For the development and commercialisation of electroactive polymer technology that can mimic the action of muscles |
| 2017 | Stephen Henry | | For the development and commercialisation of a surface-modification technology, called Kode Technology, with potential for therapeutic use including fighting cancer, reducing surgical infections and healing wounds |
| 2018 | AR37 Novel Endophyte Team | AgResearch | For developing and supporting the AR37 endophyte in agriculture, which is estimated to contribute NZ$3.6 billion to the New Zealand economy through the life of the patent |
| 2019 | Cather Simpson | University of Auckland | For pioneering research and commercialisation of innovative photonic technologies addressing challenges with a New Zealand focus and global impact |
| 2020 | Peter Beck and his research and development team | Rocket Lab | For technical breakthroughs that have allowed Rocket Lab to become the world’s leading dedicated small launch provider for small satellites. These innovations include unique motor designs, 3D printing for manufacture and carbon-composite construction. |
| 2021 | Keith Cameron and Hong Di | Lincoln University | For inventing new technology to treat dairy farm effluent to recycle water and reduce phosphate and E. coli leaching into water |
| 2022 | Rodney Badcock | Robinson Research Institute, Victoria University of Wellington | For developing superconducting technologies that are enabling electrical machines at the leading edge of current engineering practice, such as electric aircrafts [sic] and high-speed trains |
| 2023 | Low Methane Sheep Breeding Team. Key contributors: Suzanne Rowe, John McEwan, Peter Janssen and Graeme Atwood. | AgResearch | For breeding sheep which emit less methane, and for determining the potential reduction of methane emissions if these sheep can be farmed throughout Aotearoa New Zealand. |
| 2024 | Harjinder Singh | Riddet Institute, Massey University | For pioneering research and development, in creating a food ingredient to combat iron deficiency and other innovative food technologies that have bridged the gap between scientific discovery and commercial applications |
| 2025 | Aaron Marshall | University of Canterbury | for pioneering research in electrochemistry and for successfully commercialising sustainable technologies |
