= Erich Neuwirth =

Statistician and computer scientist

Erich Neuwirth (born October 17, 1948) is a professor emeritus of statistics and computer science at the University of Vienna.

== Research ==
Neuwirth studied Mathematics and Statistics at the University of Vienna and received the doctorate in 1974. He started teaching at the University of Vienna in 1969 and was promoted to professor in 1987. He was employed at the Department for Statistics and Decision Support Systems at the faculty of mathematics and the faculty of computer science.

He was a visiting professor at the Northeastern University (Boston) and the National Institute of Multimedia Education in Makuhari (Japan).

The main areas of his research are election analysis and forecasts, combinatorics, mathematics and music and spreadsheets as tools for mathematical understanding. Another important research area is the PISA studies. He investigated the statistical analysis of the PISA studies 2003 and recognized significant errors. Due to his findings the results of the studies were corrected.

== Other ==
Erich Neuwirth developed the statconn Server and R package RExcel. with Thomas Baier. The statconn server combines R and Scilab with Microsoft Excel or OpenOffice. RExcel is an add-in for Microsoft Excel, which allows the use of R within Excel.

== Awards ==
Neuwirth won the European Academic Software Award 1996 for STIMM.
This project later became the book (+ Multimedia CD) Musical Temperament mentioned in the Books section.

== Books ==
- Erich Neuwirth: Musical Temperaments, Springer, Wien (January 1998), ISBN 978-3-211-83040-6
- Erich Neuwirth, Ivo Ponocny und Wilfried Grossmann: PISA 2000 und PISA 2003: Vertiefende Analysen und Beiträge zur Methodik, Leykam (June 2006), ISBN 3-7011-7569-1
- Erich Neuwirth, Deane Arganbright: The Active Modeler: Mathematical Modeling with Microsoft Excel, Duxbury, ISBN 0-534-42085-0
- Erich Neuwirth, Richard M. Heiberger: R Through Excel: A Spreadsheet Interface for Statistics, Data Analysis, and Graphics, Springer, ISBN 978-1-4419-0051-7
