= University of Auckland Faculty of Creative Arts and Industries =

Faculty of Creative Arts and Industries
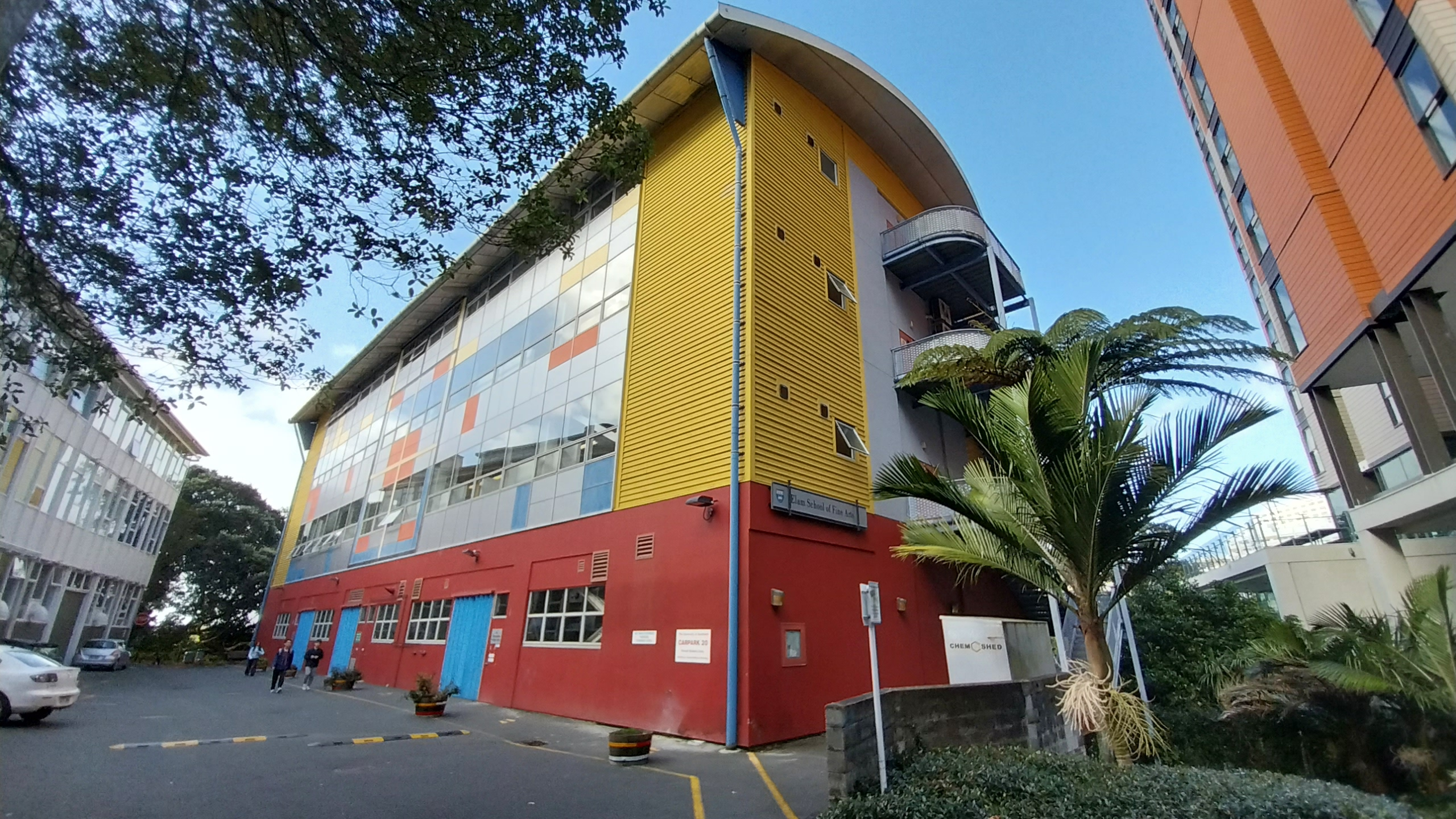
- The Mondrian Building
- Former names: National Institute of Creative Arts and Industries (NICAI)
- Type: Public
- Active: 2006–2025
- Parent institution: University of Auckland
- Dean: Nuala Gregory
- Location: Auckland, New Zealand
- Website: creative.auckland.ac.nz

The University of Auckland Faculty of Creative Arts and Industries (CAI), previously known as the National Institute of Creative Arts and Industries (NICAI), was a former faculty of the University of Auckland. The Faculty originated through a merger of the University's architecture, dance studies, fine and visual arts, music and planning programmes into NICAI in 2006. In 2016, NICAI was renamed the Faculty of Creative Arts and Industries.

In 2024, the University of Auckland proposed dividing the Faculty's creative arts and industries programmes between the proposed Faculty of Arts and Education and the Faculty of Engineering and Design. In January 2025, CAI's Dance Studies programme, Elam School of Fine Arts and School of Music were merged into the new Faculty of Arts and Education while its School of Architecture and Planning and Design programme were merged into the Faculty of Engineering and Design.

== Departments ==
- School of Architecture and Planning
- Elam School of Fine Arts
- Dance Studies Programme
- School of Music

== Degrees ==
=== Undergraduate ===
- Bachelor of Architectural Studies (BAS)
- Bachelor of Dance Studies (BDanceSt)
- Bachelor of Design (BDes)
- Bachelor of Fine Arts (BFA)
- Bachelor of Music (BMus)
- Bachelor of Urban Planning (Honours) (BUrbPlan(Hons))

=== Postgraduate ===
Architecture, Urban Planning, Urban Design and Heritage Conservation:

- Master of Architecture (Professional) (MArch (Prof))
- Master of Urban Planning (MUrbPlan)
- Postgraduate Diploma in Architecture (PGDipArch)
- Master of Architecture (MArch)
- Master of Architecture (MArch) in Sustainable Design
- Master of Planning (MPlan)
- Doctor of Philosophy (PhD) – Architecture
- Doctor of Philosophy (PhD) – Planning
- Doctor of Philosophy (PhD) – Urban Design
- Master of Urban Design (MUrbDes)
- Master of Heritage Conservation (MHerCons)
- Master of Architecture (Professional) and Heritage Conservation (MArch(Prof)HerCons)
- Master of Architecture (Professional) and Urban Design (MArch(Prof)UrbDes)
- Master of Architecture (Professional) and Urban Planning (Professional) (MArch(Prof)UrbPlan(Prof))
- Master of Urban Planning (Professional) and Heritage Conservation (MUrbPlan(Prof)HerCons)
- Master of Urban Planning (Professional) and Urban Design (MUrbPlan(Prof)UrbDes)

Dance Studies:

- Bachelor of Dance Studies (Honours) (BDanceSt(Hons)
- Postgraduate Diploma in Dance Studies (PGDipDanceSt)
- Master of Dance Studies (MDanceSt)
- Master of Community Dance (MCommDance)
- Doctor of Philosophy (PhD)

Fine Arts:

- Bachelor of Fine Arts (Honours) (BFA (Hons))
- Postgraduate Diploma in Fine Arts (PGDipFA)
- Master of Fine Arts (MFA)
- Doctor of Fine Arts (DocFA)
- Doctor of Philosophy (PhD)

Music:

- Master of Music (MMus)
- Doctor of Music (DMus)
- Doctor of Musical Arts (DMA)
- Doctor of Philosophy (PhD)
- Bachelor of Music with Honours (BMus(Hons))
- Postgraduate Diploma in Music (PGDipMus)
- Graduate Diploma in Music (GradDipMus)
