= Auckland College of Education =

New Zealand college

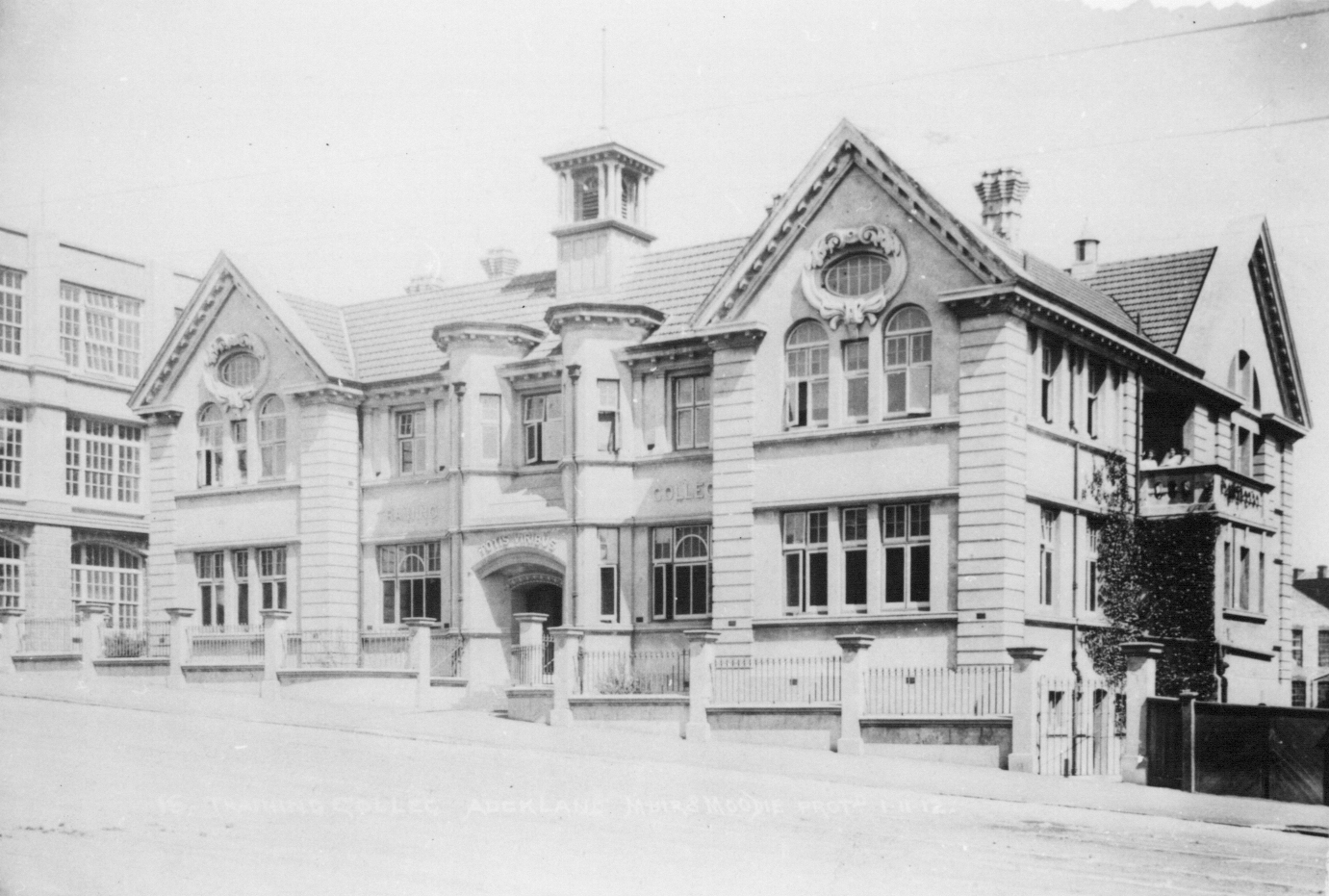
The Wellesley Street campus, pictured in 1912

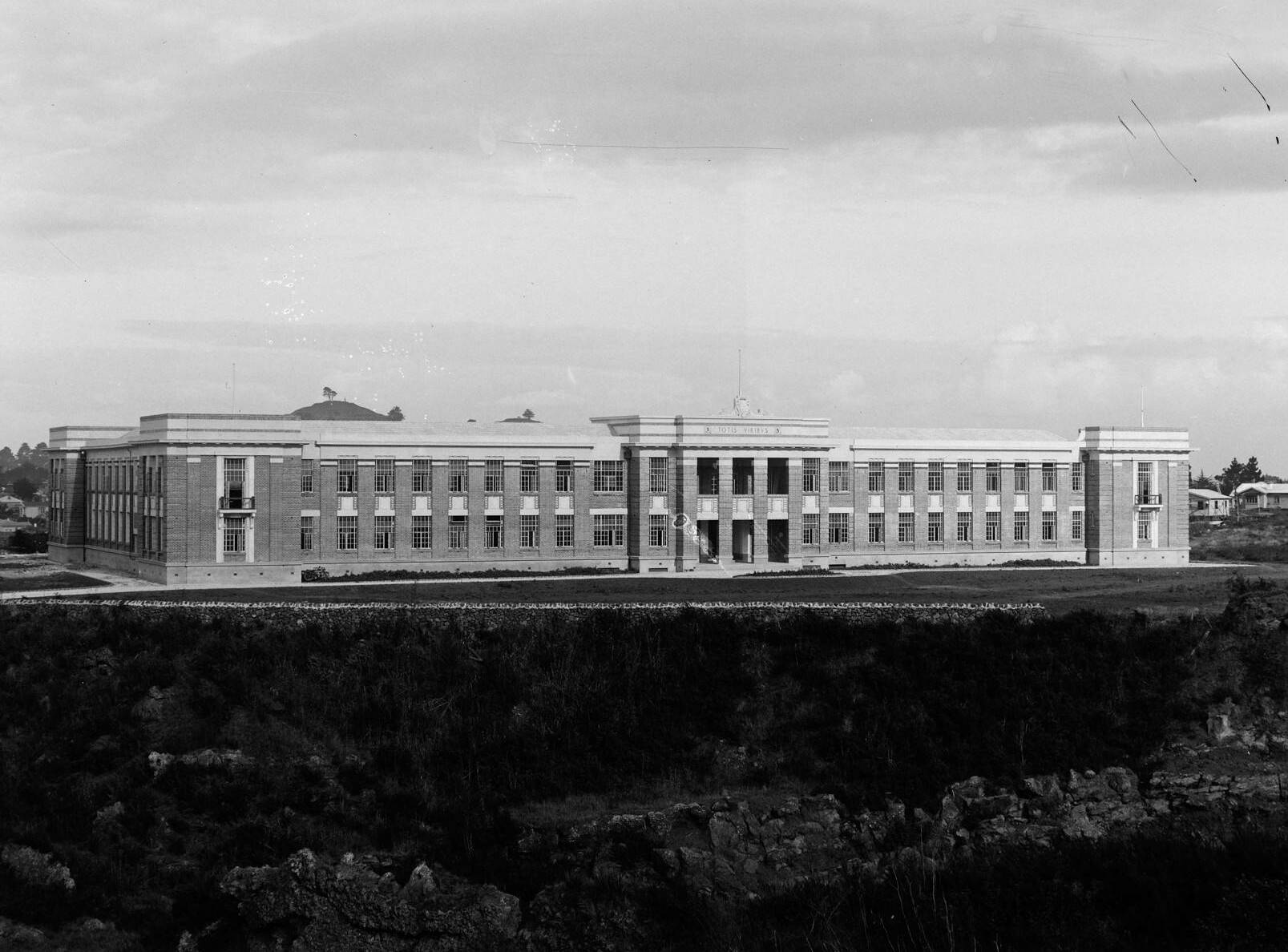
The Epsom campus, shortly after opening in 1926 (photographed by Henry Winkelmann)

The Auckland College of Education, earlier known as the Auckland Training College and the Auckland Teachers' Training College, was a teachers' college in Auckland, New Zealand's largest city. It was established in 1881 and was based in the Auckland suburb of Epsom. In 2004, the College of Education amalgamated with the University of Auckland, merging with the university's School of Education to form the Faculty of Education, now the Faculty of Education and Social Work.

== History ==
The Auckland Training College was first established in January 1881 but closed down several years later as a result of government cost-cutting. The teachers' college was re-established between 1905 and 1906. The college's Epsom campus was established in 1926 – original building 1925 by John Farrell, demolished 1976. Duncan Rae, who had been vice-principal from 1924 to 1929, was principal from 1929 to 1947. In 1936, the college was renamed the Auckland Teachers' Training College and was later renamed the Auckland Teachers' College in 1948. During its early years, the college operated as a glorified secondary school for training teachers with a strong practitioner focus.

In 1964, secondary school teaching was transferred to a second teachers' training college called the Auckland Post-Primary Teachers' College, which was renamed the Secondary Teachers' College in 1966. During the 1970s, a more comprehensive three-year education program for training primary school teachers was introduced. The college also began to provide early childhood and secondary education courses. In 1971, the Secondary Teachers' College introduced a pilot Māori culture and language programme, which was followed by a full-time Māori language course in 1974. By 1980, the Secondary Teachers' College had its own Māori studies department. The Teachers' College absorbed the Ardmore Teachers' College (1974), Loretta Hall, Kindergarten Teachers' College (1975) and North Shore Teachers' College (1982). In 1986, the various early childhood, primary, and secondary education colleges merged into the Auckland College of Education. The merged college also offered courses in social work, counselling, and human services.

In 1990, the Auckland College of Education introduced a three-year early childhood programme and equivalency courses that allowed those already working in the sector to upgrade to the new Diploma of Teaching. In July 1992, the College established a campus in Whangārei called the Tai Tokerau Campus or Te Kura Akoranga o Te Tai Tokerau to deal with a growing teacher shortage. In 1994, the College purchased the Alexander Street site, which could accommodate 100 students. Over the next decade, the Whangārei campus would train more than 320 early-childhood and primary teachers. In 2002, the Whangārei campus began offering secondary teacher education. During the 1990s, the College established more branches, at Rotorua and Kaikohe, for the delivery of Māori programmes, and at Tokoroa for delivering Pasifika early-childhood programmes. During the 1990s, the College also established diploma programmes to deal with the growing Pacific Islander population in Auckland, culminating in the creation of Faculty Pasifika in 2001.

In 2002, the Auckland College of Education and the University of Auckland entered into talks regarding collaboration, culminating in a joint merge proposal to the New Zealand Government in 2003. On 29 July 2004, the education minister, Trevor Mallard, and the associate education minister, Steve Maharey, announced that the College of Education would merge with the University of Auckland on 1 September 2004. The two colleges merged to become the University of Auckland's Faculty of Education, which became the Faculty of Education and Social Work in 2015. In 2025, the Faculty of Education and Social Work was amalgamated into the Faculty of Arts and Education.
