= Friedrich Leisch =

Austrian statistician (1968–2024)

- Born: 31 July 1968; Vienna, Austria
- Died: 24 April 2024 (aged 55)
- Known for: Development of R, Sweave

Academic background
- Education: Vienna University of Technology
- Thesis: Ensemble Methods for Neural Clustering and Classification (1999)
- Doctoral advisor: Kurt Hornik

Academic work
- Discipline: Statistics, statistical computing
- Institutions: Vienna University of Technology; LMU Munich; University of Natural Resources and Life Sciences, Vienna

Friedrich "Fritz" Leisch (31 July 1968 – 24 April 2024) was an Austrian statistician known for his pioneering contributions to the R programming language and the field of statistical computing. He was a key figure in the development of the R project and co-founder of the CRAN.

== Early life and education ==
Born in Vienna, Austria, Friedrich Leisch completed his education in Technical Mathematics at the Technische Universität Wien (TU Wien). He received his doctorate in 1999 with a thesis titled Ensemble Methods for Neural Clustering and Classification, supervised by Kurt Hornik, and achieved his habilitation in statistics in 2005.

== Career ==
Leisch's academic career began at TU Wien, moving to LMU Munich in 2006 as a professor of statistics. He returned to Vienna in 2011 to serve as a full professor at the University of Natural Resources and Life Sciences (BOKU), where he led the Institute of Applied Statistics and Computing.

== Contributions ==
Leisch was instrumental in the early stages of the R project, joining the R Core Development Team and later serving as the first Secretary General of the R Foundation for Statistical Computing. He developed the Sweave system, integrating R with LaTeX to promote reproducible research. He co-organized several seminal conferences in Vienna, namely the first three "Distributed Statistical Computing (DSC)" conferences (1999, 2001, 2003) as well as the first useR! conference in 2004.

== Death ==
Leisch died on 24 April 2024, at the age of 55, following a serious illness. His death was mourned across the statistical community and at BOKU University, which published a tribute expressing their loss.
