= RExcel =

Add-in for Microsoft Excel

- Developer: Erich Neuwirth
- Stable release: 3.2.9 / 6 January 2013; 13 years ago
- Platform: R programming language, Microsoft Excel, Microsoft Windows
- Type: Statistical software, Spreadsheet
- Website: rcom.univie.ac.at

RExcel is an add-on for Microsoft Excel that allows access to the statistics package R from within Excel. It uses the statconnDCOM server and, for certain configurations, the room package.

RExcel runs on Microsoft Windows (XP, Vista, or 7), with Excel 2003, 2007, 2010, and 2013.

The RExcelInstaller package was removed from CRAN due to FOSS license restrictions.
