= Aaron Marshall =

New Zealand academic

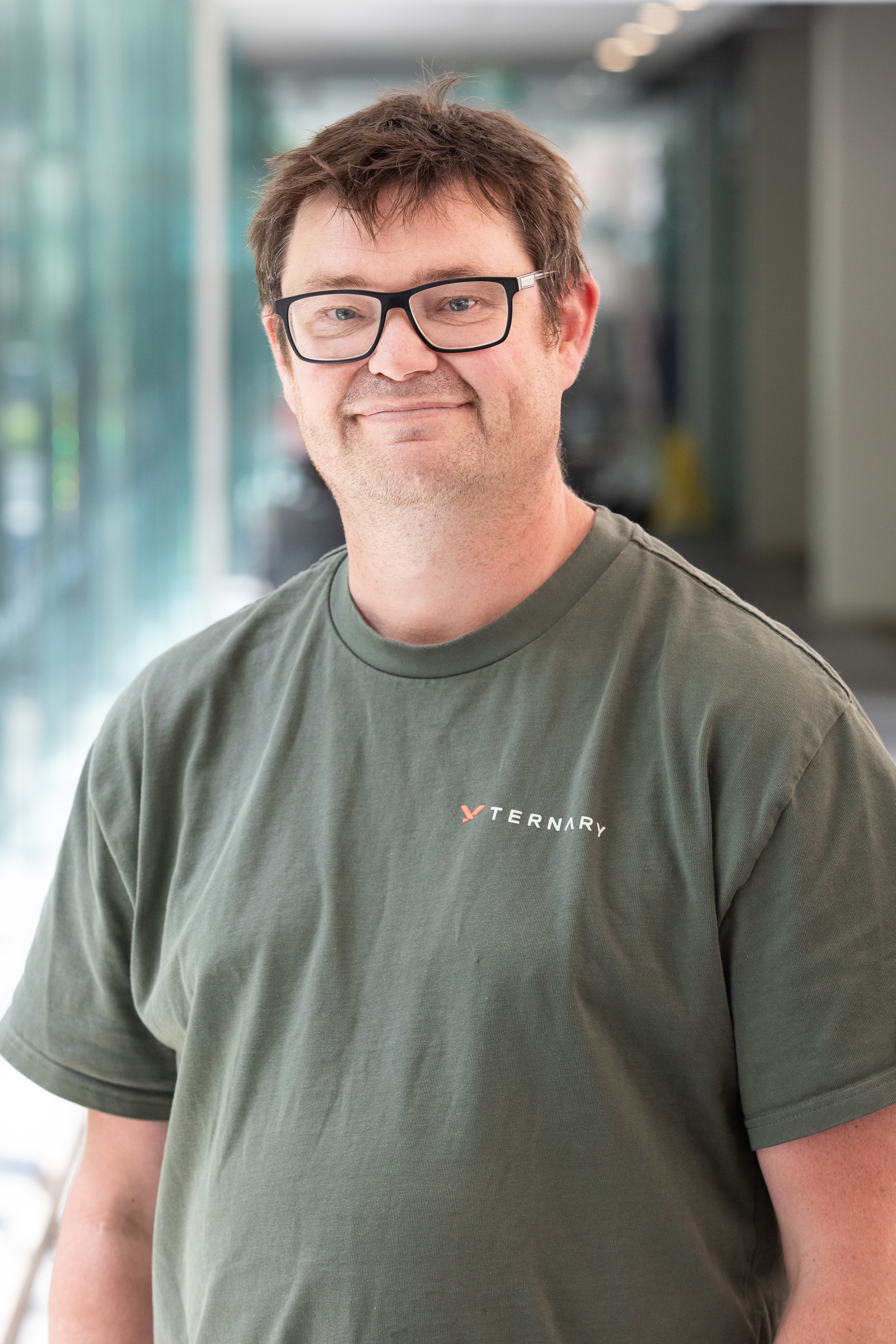
- Marshall in 2025
- Education: Victoria University of Wellington
- Awards: Pickering Medal
- Scientific career
- Fields: Electrochemistry
- Workplaces: University of Canterbury College of Engineering
- Thesis: Investigation of cryolite ratio measurement by potentiometric methods (2002)

Aaron Marshall is a New Zealand electrochemist researching improvements to industrial electrochemistry, and a professor of Chemical and Process Engineering at the University of Canterbury.

== Academic career ==
After graduating with a Bachelor of Technology (Hons) at Massey University in 2001, Marshall completed a 2002 Masters thesis titled Investigation of cryolite ratio measurement by potentiometric methods at Massey. He then undertook a PhD at the Norwegian University of Science and Technology, finishing in 2005. Marshall joined the Faculty of Engineering at the University of Canterbury in 2009, was appointed full professor in December 2021, and in 2024 was Associate Head of the Department of Chemical and Process Engineering. He is a Principal Investigator at the MacDiarmid Institute for Advanced Materials and Nanotechnology, and an Associate Investigator in the University of Canterbury's Biomolecular Interaction Centre.

== Research ==
Marshall's electrochemical research concerns managing chemical reactions on the surface of electrodes in energy and hydrogen technologies, looking at ways to minimise the operating costs and emissions of electrochemistry at an industrial scale. He began his research career in fundamental science, and then began applying it to commercial opportunities, cofounding two spin-out companies that have commercialised his research: Zethos and Ternary Kinetics.

Zethos, founded in 2019 by Marshall and his Master's student Jonathan Ring under the name Zincovery, produces high-quality pure zinc recycled from steel industry waste. While visiting a galvanised steel factory in 2018, Marshall was told a huge amount of zinc in scrap steel was being sent to landfill. During the recycling of scrap galvanised steel, the steel is melted in a furnace but the zinc and other materials are vaporised into furnace dust; an average steel mill will produce tens of thousands of tonnes of furnace dust a year. Marshall developed a novel process for extracting the zinc bound in very stable oxides in this dust. His process reduces emissions by 95% and operating costs by 45% compared with conventional zinc recovery using the Waelz process, which produces twice the greenhouse gas emissions of simply mining the metal. The company won the 2020 C-Prize from Callaghan Innovation, and raised $3 million from investors in 2022. In April 2026 Zethos opened a $6 million, 2500 m² pilot processing plant in Bromley, Christchurch with 17 staff and a capacity of 1000 tonnes of metal a year. Marshall has stated "In 20 years, I hope zinc is no longer mined at all – it will be recovered and reused."

Marshall and his colleague Sally Brooker have been active in promoting the production of green hydrogen in New Zealand. Ternary Kinetics, started in 2023, has developed a renewable energy system that stores hydrogen for electricity generation in a liquid carrier. The liquid can be transported and stored using existing diesel fuel infrastructure, and its hydrogen can be discharged and recharged after use. Marshall's work was to develop an efficient electrocatalytic pathway to retrieve energy from the liquid. This technology allows energy to be generated renewably in one area and transported to power heavy machinery in another.

== Selected works ==
- Laura J. Titheridge; Aaron T. Marshall (2024). "Techno-economic modelling of AEM electrolysis systems to identify ideal current density and aspects requiring further research". International Journal of Hydrogen Energy. 49: 518–532. doi:10.1016/j.ijhydene.2023.08.181. Wikidata Q138419083.
- Aaron T. Marshall; Laurent Vaisson-Béthune (2015). "Avoid the quasi-equilibrium assumption when evaluating the electrocatalytic oxygen evolution reaction mechanism by Tafel slope analysis". Electrochemistry Communications. 61: 23–26. doi:10.1016/j.elecom.2015.09.019. Wikidata Q107604087.
- Aaron T. Marshall; Richard G. Haverkamp (2010). "Electrocatalytic activity of IrO2–RuO2 supported on Sb-doped SnO2 nanoparticles". Electrochimica Acta. 55 (6): 1978–1984. doi:10.1016/j.electacta.2009.11.018. Wikidata Q107604103.
- A. Marshall; S. Sunde; M. Tsypkin; R. Tunold (2007). "Performance of a PEM water electrolysis cell using IrxRuyTazO2IrxRuyTazO2 electrocatalysts for the oxygen evolution electrode". International Journal of Hydrogen Energy. 32 (13): 2320–2324. doi:10.1016/j.ijhydene.2007.02.013. Wikidata Q107604111.
- A. Marshall; B. Børresen; G. Hagen; M. Tsypkin; R. Tunold (2007). "Hydrogen production by advanced proton exchange membrane (PEM) water electrolysers—Reduced energy consumption by improved electrocatalysis". Energy. 32 (4): 431–436. doi:10.1016/j.energy.2006.07.014. Wikidata Q107604108.

== Honours and awards ==
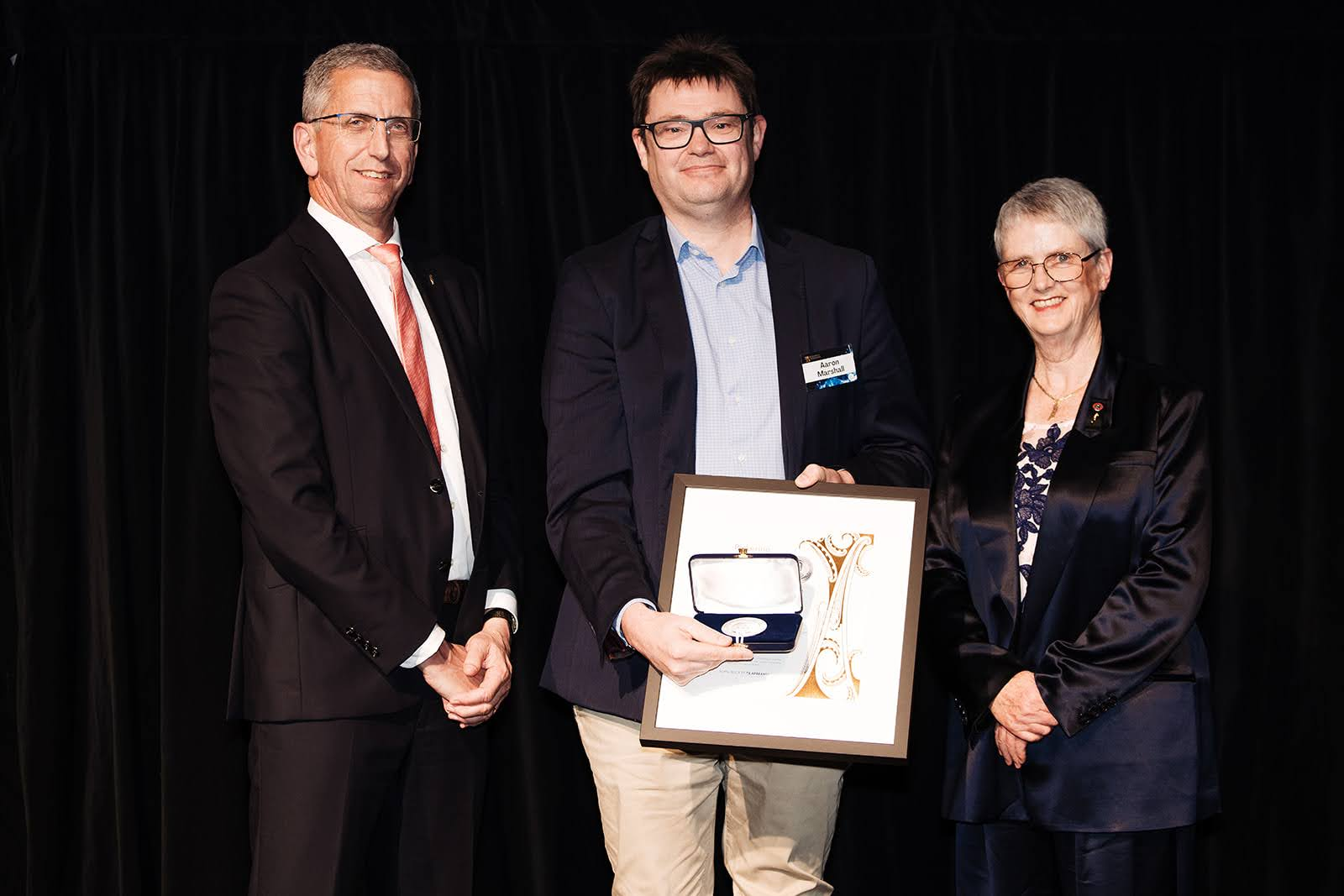
Marshall receiving the 2025 Pickering Medal

Marshall was awarded the 2025 Pickering Medal from the Royal Society Te Apārangi for his electrochemistry research and his work on commercialisation of technologies to improve the sustainability and efficiency of industrial electrochemistry.
