= University of Auckland Faculty of Engineering and Design =

Faculty of Engineering and Design
- Te Herenga Auaha (Māori)
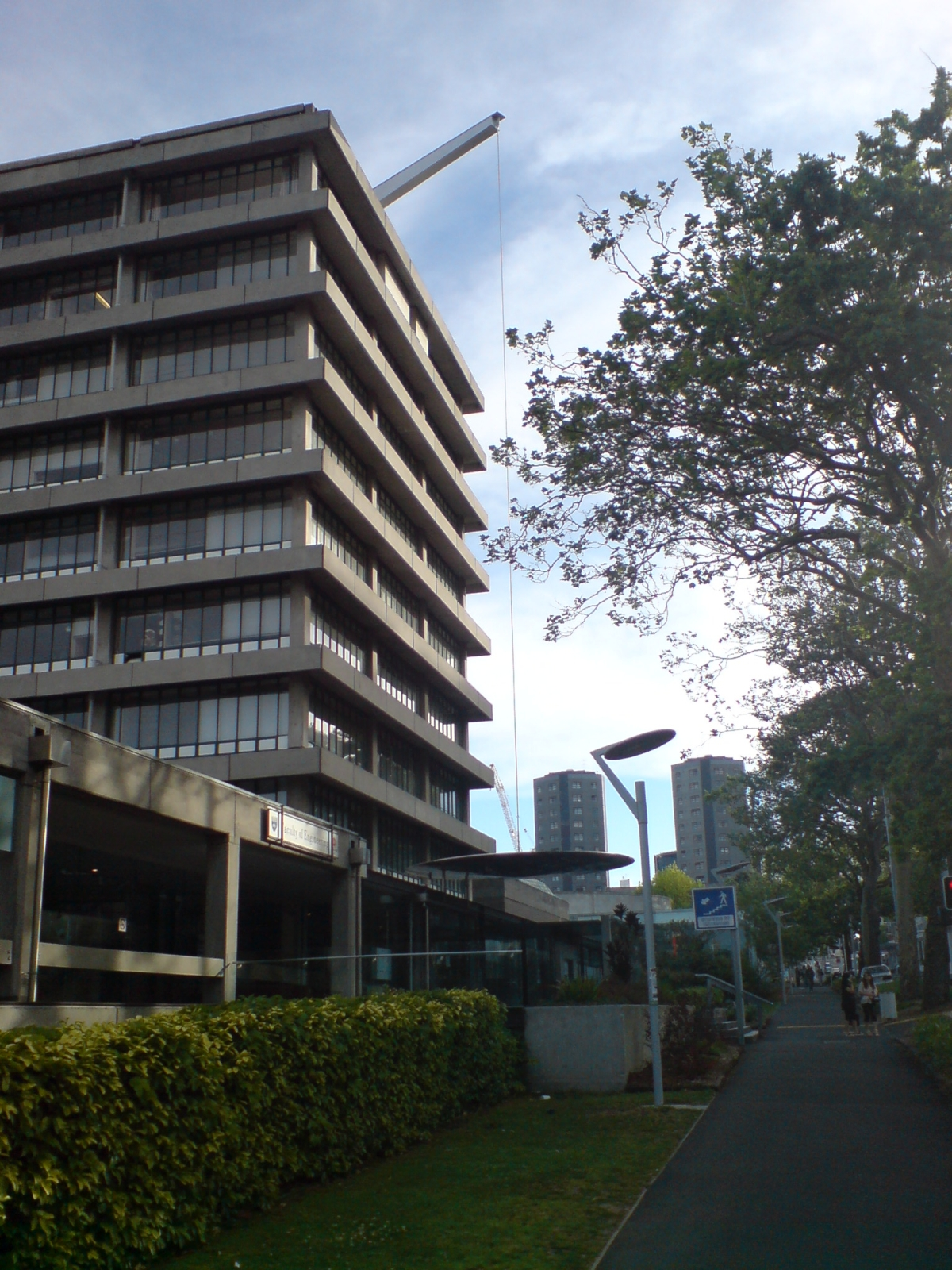
- The faculty buildings on Symonds Street
- Type: Public
- Parent institution: University of Auckland
- Dean: Richard Clarke
- Academic staff: 160
- Administrative staff: 150
- Students: 4300
- Undergraduates: 3700
- Postgraduates: 600
- Doctoral students: 400
- Location: Auckland, New Zealand
- Website: engineering.auckland.ac.nz
- Enrolment data as of 2013

The University of Auckland Faculty of Engineering and Design (Māori: Te Herenga Auaha) is one of six faculties that make up the University of Auckland. Located on Symonds Street, Auckland, it has been consistently rated as the best Engineering School in New Zealand for quality of research.

== Facilities ==
The faculty itself is based at the University of Auckland City Campus, with many research groups based at the Newmarket Campus, including the Center for Advanced Materials and Manufacturing Design (CAMMD), and the Centre for Robotics and Automation Engineering Sciences (CARES) The Faculty has been undergoing recent renovation at its city Campus, including a new state-of-the-art building opened in 2019. This is addition to its large-scale Engineering laboratories located at the Newmarket campus.

== History ==
The Faculty of Engineering and Design originated as Auckland University College's School of Mines, which was founded in 1906. In 1948, the-then School of Engineering relocated from Princes Street to Ardmore. During the late 1960s, the School moved to its current premises at 20 Symonds Street in Central Auckland.

The faculty was made famous for its role in Team New Zealand's America's Cup victory in 1995 and 2000, instrumental in its contribution was the world's first Twisted Flow Wind Tunnel built in 1994 at the Tamaki Campus that allows better simulation of the flow of wind over yacht sails by varying the angle of attack with height. The newer wind tunnel situated at the Newmarket campus is used for a variety of research and teaching purposes, but is primarily used commercially to provide pedestrian wind environment tests for new building consents for the Auckland City Council using its 1:400 scale model of the Auckland City central business district.

In March 2024, the University of Auckland proposed transferring the Faculty of Creative Arts and Industries' (CAI) "School of Architecture and Planning" and Design Programme into the Faculty of Engineering. In January 2025, the Faculty of Engineering merged with the School of Architecture and Planning and the Design Programme to form the present "Faculty of Engineering and Design." The remaining components of the CAI were merged into the new Faculty of Arts and Education.

== Departments ==
- Department of Chemical and Materials Engineering
- Department of Civil and Environmental Engineering
- Department of Electrical and Computer Engineering
- Department of Engineering Science and Biomedical Engineering
- Department of Mechanical and Mechatronics Engineering

== Degrees ==
=== Undergraduate ===
- Bachelor of Engineering (Honors)
  - Biomedical Engineering
  - Chemical and Materials Engineering
  - Civil Engineering (including Environmental Engineering)
  - Computer Systems Engineering
  - Electrical and Electronic Engineering
  - Engineering Science
  - Mechanical Engineering (including Woodfibre Composites)
  - Mechatronics Engineering
  - Software Engineering
  - Structural Engineering
- Bachelor of Engineering / Bachelor of Arts Conjoint
- Bachelor of Engineering / Bachelor of Commerce Conjoint
- Bachelor of Engineering / Bachelor of Design Conjoint
- Bachelor of Engineering / Bachelor of Science Conjoint
- Bachelor of Engineering / Bachelor of Music Conjoint
- Bachelor of Architectural Studies
- Bachelor of Design
- Bachelor of Design / Bachelor of Arts Conjoint
- Bachelor of Design / Bachelor of Commerce Conjoint
- Bachelor of Design / Bachelor of Science Conjoint
- Bachelor of Urban Planning (Honours)

=== Postgraduate ===
- Master of Engineering
- Master of Engineering Management
- Master of Engineering Studies
- Master of Operations Research
- Doctor of Philosophy
- Doctor of Engineering
- Diplomas and Certificates
- Graduate Diploma in Engineering
- Graduate Diploma in Engineering (Transportation)
- Graduate Diploma in Operations Research
- Postgraduate Certificate in Geothermal Energy Technology
