= University of Auckland Faculty of Arts and Education =

Division of the University of Auckland, NZ

Coordinates: 36°52′57.39″S 174°45′58.57″E

Faculty of Arts and Education
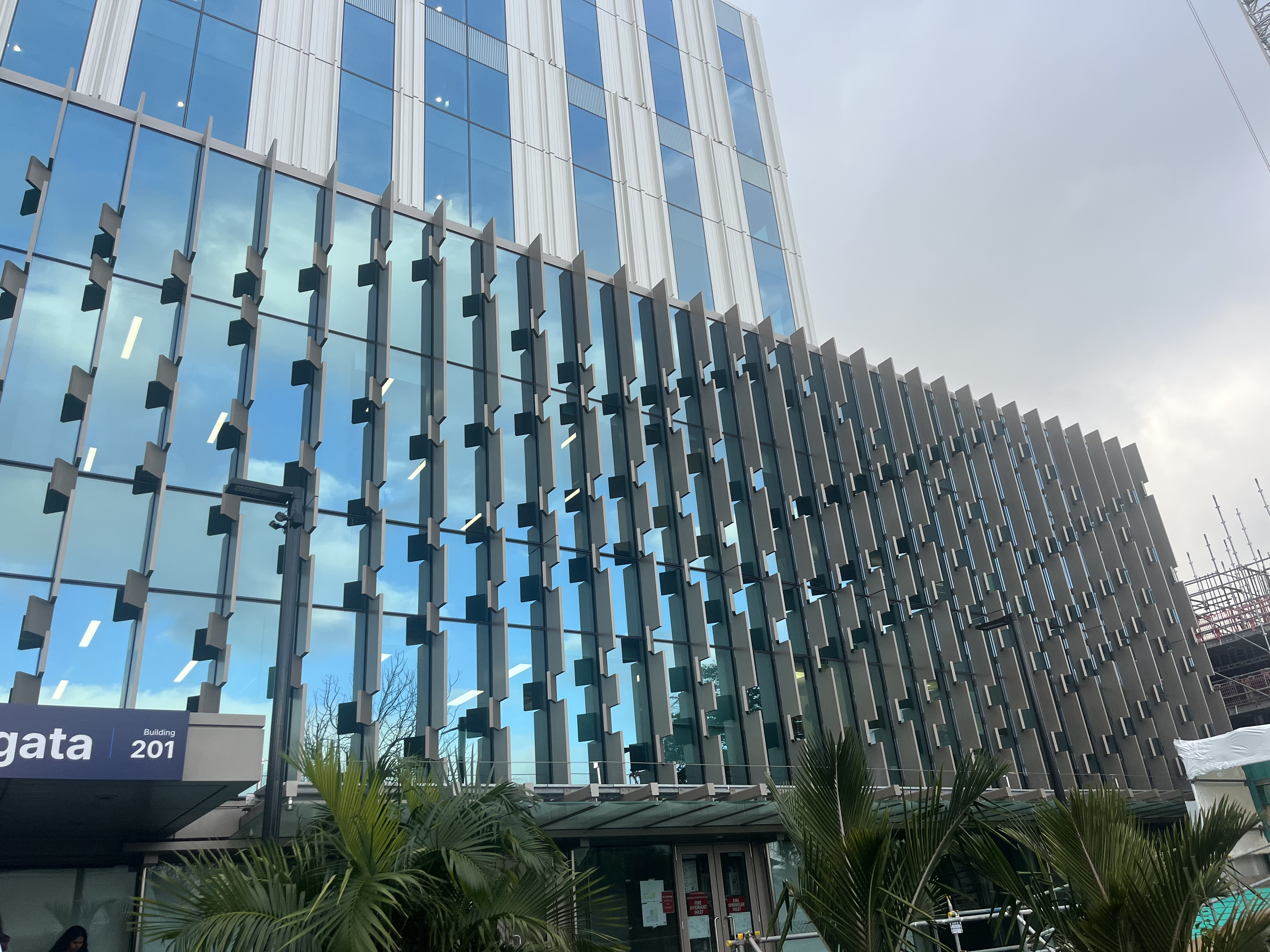
- Building 201 on Symond Street, one of the Faculty 's main buildings.
- Former names: Faculty of Arts; Faculty of Education and Social Work
- Type: Public
- Established: 2025
- Parent institution: University of Auckland
- Dean: Katherine Smits (acting)
- Location: Auckland, New Zealand
- Website: https://www.auckland.ac.nz/en/arts.html

The University of Auckland Faculty of Arts and Education (Māori: Te Pūtahi Mātauranga) is the combined arts, education, social work, music and dancing faculty of the University of Auckland. It was created in 2025 through a merger of the Faculties of Arts, Education and Social Work, the Elam School of Fine Arts, the School of Music and the Dance Studies programme into a unified entity.

== History ==
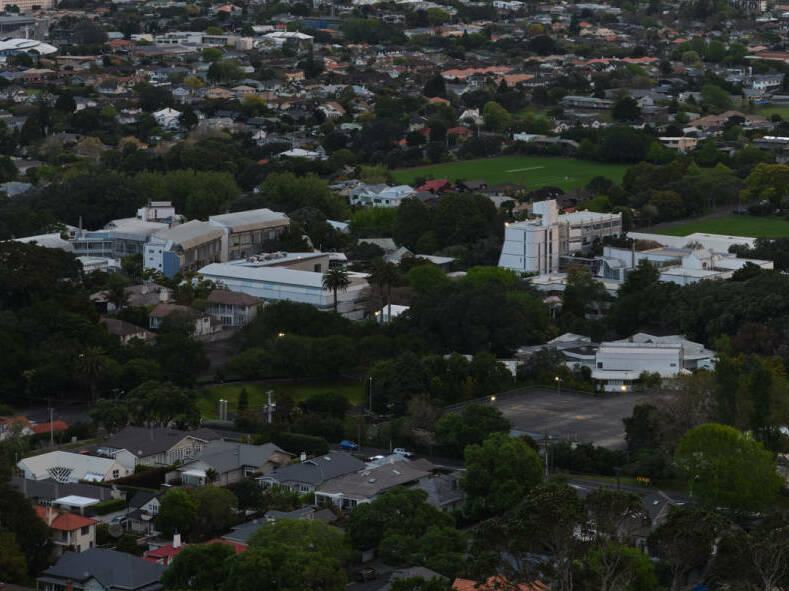
View of the former Education campus in Epsom from Maungawhau

The Faculty of Education was established in 1 September 2004 through a merger of the University of Auckland's School of Education and the Auckland College of Education. The Auckland College of Education had been established in 1881 to provide teacher training in the Auckland region. In 1977, the University of Auckland had established its own School of Education to compete with the Auckland College after the New Zealand Government relaxed its policy on teacher training providers. The Faculty of Education's first Dean was Dr John Langley, who had previously headed the College of Education. In 2008, he was succeeded by Graeme Aitken, who served until late 2017. In 2015 the Faculty changed its name to Faculty of Education and Social Work to better reflect the research and qualifications offered. In 2018, Mark Barrow became the Dean of Education and Social Work.

On 30 September 2018, the Dean of Education Mark Barrow confirmed that the Faculty would be relocating from its Epsom campus to the University of Auckland's City Campus in 2020. An article in The New Zealand Herald noted there are plans to sell the site to the Māori tribe Ngāti Whātua.

In addition, a new education campus was established in Ōtara in partnership with the Manukau Institute of Technology in early 2020.

Later, the relocation of the Faculty of Education and Social Work from Epsom to the City Campus was postponed to late 2023, with teaching to resume at the refurbished Building 201 in 2024. The refurbished Building 201 will be funded through the Government's "shovel-ready" funding. By November 2023, the former education and social work campus had finished relocating from Epsom to the City Campus.

After consultation in 2024, the university merged the Faculties of Education and Social Work, the Elam School of Fine Arts, the School of Music and the Dance Studies programme into a new entity called the Faculty of Arts and Education in January 2025. The School of Music and Dance Programme has previously been part of the former Faculty of Creative Arts and Industries, which was also disestablished in 2025. The university presented the consolidation as a means of strengthening partnerships and transdisciplinary research, and of remaining a comprehensive institution as funding for the humanities, arts and social sciences deteriorated.

In late September 2026, ACT New Zealand leader David Seymour said that the party would campaign on the Government buying the former Epsom campus from the University of Auckland to build a new school. Seymour said that the principals and boards of the nearby Auckland Grammar School and Epsom Girls' Grammar School had expressed interest in co-sponsoring a new co-educational high school on that land.

== Locations and facilities ==
The Faculty of Arts and Education is based at the University of Auckland's City Campus on Symond Street. The former Faculty of Education and Social Work was previously based in Epsom, a suburb in central Auckland.

The Faculty of Arts and Education also offers a limited number of undergraduate and postgraduate courses and programmes at its Te Tai Tokerau Campus in Whangārei.

== Courses and programs ==
The Faculty of Arts and Education consists of five schools: the School of Creative Arts, the School of Education and Social Practice, the School of Humanities, the School of Social Sciences and Te Wānanga o Waipapa (which focuses on Māori and Pasifika knowledge and studies). The Faculty also offers a range of undergraduate, postgraduate and doctoral studies and programmes.
