= Robert Gentleman (statistician) =

Canadian statistician

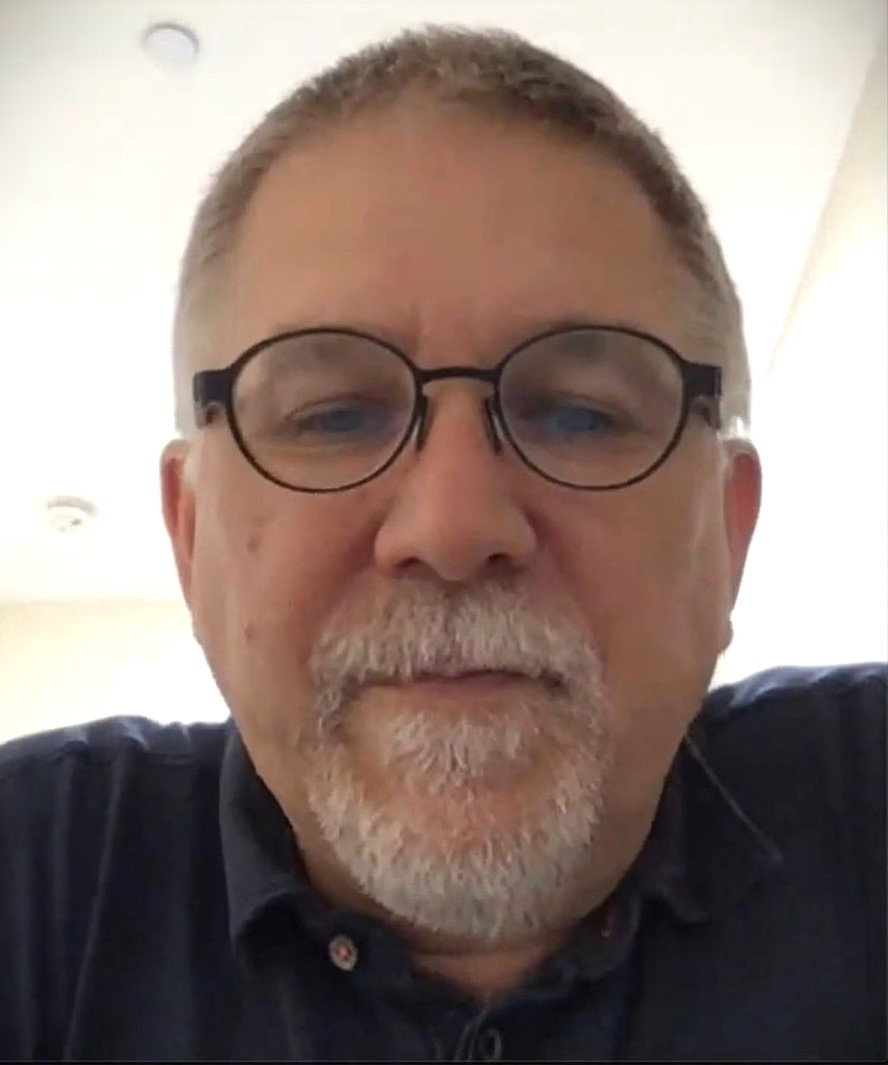
- Gentleman in 2020
- Born: Robert Clifford Gentleman; Canada
- Education: University of Washington; University of British Columbia
- Known for: R (programming language)
- Awards: Benjamin Franklin Award (Bioinformatics)
- Scientific career
- Workplaces: Genentech; University of Washington; Harvard Medical School; University of Waterloo; The University of Auckland
- Thesis: Exploratory methods for censored data (1988)
- Doctoral advisor: John James Crowley

Robert Clifford Gentleman (born 1959) is a Canadian statistician and bioinformatician who is currently the founding executive director of the Center for Computational Biomedicine at Harvard Medical School. He was previously the vice president of computational biology at 23andMe. Gentleman is recognized, along with Ross Ihaka, as one of the originators of the R programming language and the Bioconductor project.

== Education ==
Gentleman was awarded a Bachelor of Science degree in mathematics from the University of British Columbia. He was awarded a Ph.D. degree in statistics from University of Washington in 1988; his thesis title was Exploratory methods for censored data.

== Research and career ==
Gentleman worked as a statistics professor at the University of Auckland in the mid-1990s, where he developed the R programming language alongside Ross Ihaka. In 2001, he started work on the Bioconductor project to promote the development of open-source tools for bioinformatics and computational biology. In 2009, Gentleman joined the Genentech biotechnology corporation, where he worked as a senior director in bioinformatics and computational biology. Gentleman joined personal genomics and biotechnology company 23andMe as vice president in April 2015, with the goal of bringing expertise on bioinformatics and computational drug discovery to the company. Gentleman has also served on the board of the statistical software company Revolution Analytics (formerly known as REvolution Computing).

=== Awards and honors ===
Gentleman won the Benjamin Franklin Award in 2008, recognising his work on the R programming language, the Bioconductor project and his commitment to data and methods sharing. He was made a Fellow of the International Society for Computational Biology in 2014 for his contribution to computational biology and bioinformatics. He became a fellow of the American Statistical Association in 2017. He received an honorary Doctorate of Science from the University of British Columbia in 2026 for his contributions to statistics, computational biology, and open-source software for scientific applications.
