= Ross Ihaka =

New Zealand statistician

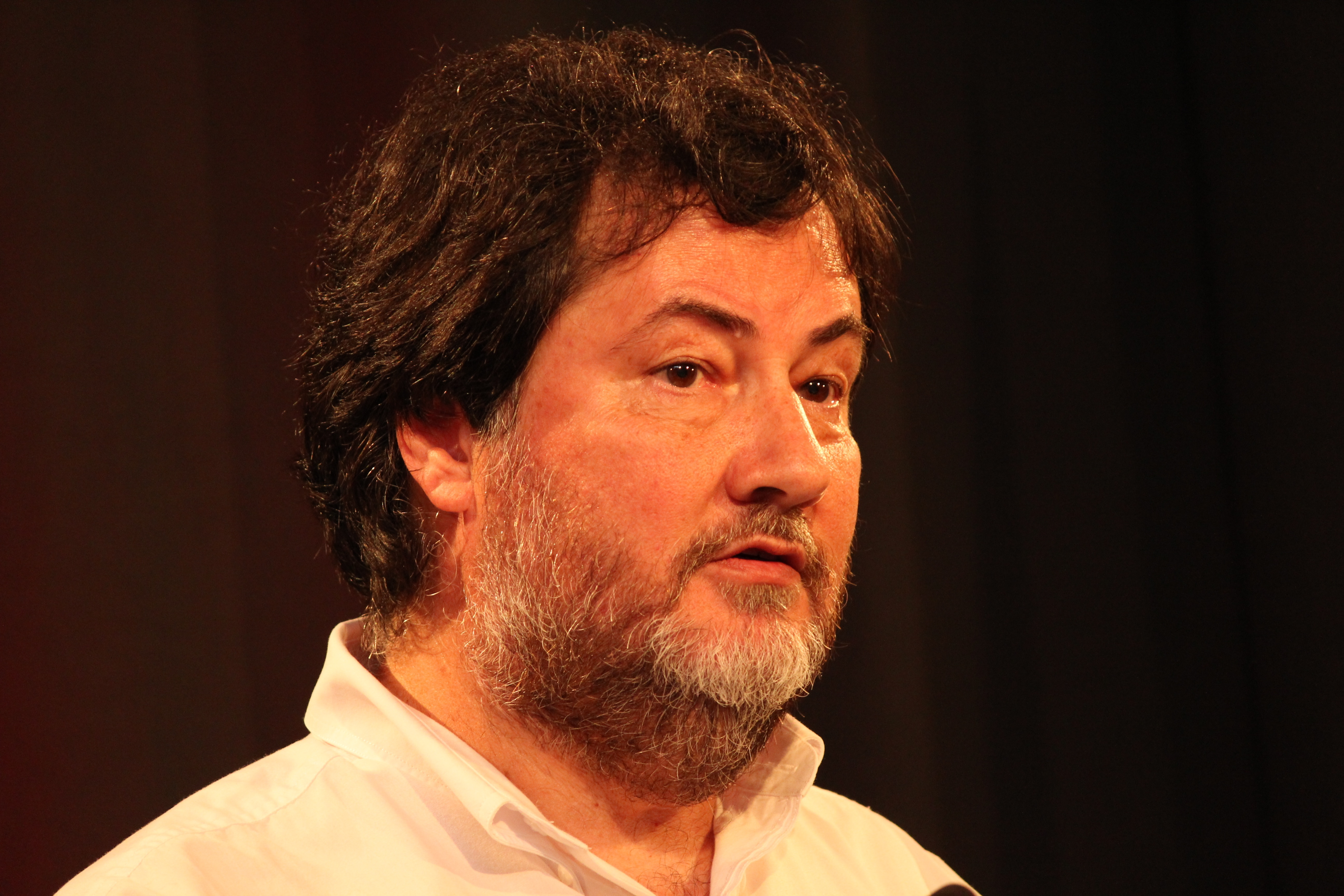
- Ihaka at the 2010 New Zealand Open Source Awards
- Born: George Ross Ihaka; 1954 (age 71–72); Waiuku, New Zealand
- Education: University of Auckland; University of California, Berkeley (PhD)
- Known for: R programming language
- Awards: Pickering Medal (2008)
- Scientific career
- Fields: Statistical computing
- Workplaces: University of Auckland
- Thesis: Rūaumoko (1985)
- Doctoral advisor: David R. Brillinger
- Website: www.stat.auckland.ac.nz/~ihaka/

George Ross Ihaka (born 1954) is a New Zealand statistician who was an associate professor of statistics at the University of Auckland until his retirement in 2017. Alongside Robert Gentleman, he is one of the creators of the R programming language. In 2008, Ihaka received the Pickering Medal, awarded by the Royal Society of New Zealand, for his work on R.

== Education ==
Ihaka completed his undergraduate education at the University of Auckland, and obtained his PhD in 1985 from the University of California, Berkeley supervised by David R. Brillinger. His thesis was on statistical modelling for seismic interferometry and was titled Rūaumoko, after the god of earthquakes, volcanoes and seasons in Māori mythology.

== Career and research ==
As of 2010, he was working on a new statistical programming language based on Lisp. The Department of Statistics at the University of Auckland started a public lecture series in his honour in 2017.

== Personal life ==
Ihaka is of Ngāti Kahungunu, Rangitāne and Ngati Pākehā (New Zealand European) descent.
