= Peter Dalgaard =

Danish statistician (born 1959)

- Born: 1959 (age 66–67)
- Citizenship: Danish
- Education: University of Copenhagen
- Known for: R (Core Team member); Introductory Statistics with R
- Scientific career
- Fields: Statistics, Biostatistics, Statistical computing
- Workplaces: Copenhagen Business School; University of Copenhagen
- Website: www.cbs.dk/en/research/departments/department-finance/peter-dalgaard

Peter Dalgaard (born 1959) is a Danish statistician and one of the core developers of the R statistical programming language. He is a professor at Copenhagen Business School and was previously a professor of biostatistics at the University of Copenhagen, where he obtained his MSc in 1985 and PhD in 1991.

Dalgaard co-edited the Scandinavian Journal of Statistics from 2016 to 2018.

== Selected publications ==
- Dalgaard, Peter (2008). Introductory Statistics with R. Statistics and Computing (Second ed.). Springer. doi:10.1007/978-0-387-79054-1. ISBN 978-0-387-79053-4.
