= Roger Peng =

Statistician

Roger D. Peng
- Occupations: Professor, author, software developer
- Awards: ASA Fellow

Academic background
- Education: Yale University (BS); University of California, Los Angeles (MS, PhD)

Academic work
- Discipline: Statistics and Data Science
- Sub-discipline: Environmental health, air pollution, climate change, software programming
- Institutions: University of Texas at Austin
- Website: https://rdpeng.org/

Roger D. Peng is an author and professor of Statistics and Data Science at the University of Texas at Austin. Peng originally received a Bachelor of Science in Applied Mathematics from Yale University in 1999, before going on to study at the University of California, Los Angeles, where he completed a Master of Science in Statistics in 2001 and a PhD in Statistics in 2003. The focus of his research has been on environmental health, specifically focusing on air pollution and climate change in his research. Peng is also a software engineer who has authored numerous R packages focused on applying statistical methods necessary for a variety of topics. He has also created numerous resources including books, online courses, podcasts, blogs, and other articles to aid those learning data analysis.

== Career ==
Peng has written or contributed to ten different books, including R Programming for Data Science, which lays the foundation for using the R programming language. He, along with Jeff Leek and Rafa Irizarry, actively contribute to Simply Statistics, a website containing courses, articles, interviews, blog posts, and other materials for statisticians and those interested in data focused on various biostatistics topics. Peng and Leek join Brian Caffo as co-creators of the Data Science Specialization massive open online course (MOOC) offered through Johns Hopkins University, which is a collection of courses geared towards individuals seeking to develop skills in data science and data analysis.

Peng is the co-host with Hilary Parker of the data science podcast Not So Standard Deviations. Parker and Peng also have co-authored Conversations on Data Science, which compiles many of the topics covered on their podcast, as well as other discussions related to data science. Peng actively contributes journal articles to several publications, most commonly related to providing evidence to the prevalence of air pollution. He has written on the importance of creating reproducible research and the practice of using various statistical methods.

== Awards ==
Peng's work in biostatistics, especially related to environmental health, has led to numerous awards. In 2016, Peng received the American Public Health Association Mortimer Spiegelman Award to honor his contributions to public health statistics, given to a member under the age of 40. Additionally, Peng has received several awards for his publications, including multiple honors for NIEHS Extramural Paper of the Month. In 2017, Peng was elected a Fellow of the American Statistical Association.
