= Zelen =

Zelen may refer to:

- Ljiljana Zelen Karadžić (born 1945), the wife of the former Bosnian Serb leader Radovan Karadžić
- Marvin Zelen, statistician
- Zelen's design, experimental design for randomized clinical trials proposed by statistician Marvin Zelen
