= Mortimer Spiegelman Award =

American annual award for health statisticians

The Mortimer Spiegelman Award was established by the American Public Health Association in 1970 to honor a statistician under age 40 who has made outstanding contributions to health statistics, especially public health statistics.

== Recipients ==
- 1970: Edward Perrin
- 1971: Peter A. Lachenbruch
- 1972: Manning Feinleib
- 1973: Joseph L. Fleiss
- 1974: Gary G. Koch
- 1975: Jane Menken
- 1976: Abdelmonem A. Afifi
- 1977: David Hoel
- 1978: Ross Prentice
- 1979: Mitchell H. Gail
- 1980: Norman Breslow
- 1981: Robert F. Woolson
- 1982: Joel Kleinman
- 1983: J. Richard Landis
- 1984: Stephen Lagakos
- 1985: John Crowley (statistician)
- 1986: Anastasios Tsiatis
- 1987: L. J. Wei
- 1988: Thomas Fleming (statistician)
- 1989: Colin B. Begg
- 1990: Kung-Yee Liang
- 1991: Scott L. Zeger
- 1992: Ronald S. Brookmeyer
- 1993: Martin Abba Tanner
- 1994: Louise M. Ryan
- 1995: Christopher J. Portier
- 1996: Jeremy M. G. Taylor
- 1997: Margaret S. Pepe
- 1998: Peter Bacchett
- 1999: Danyu Lin
- 2000: Bradley P. Carlin
- 2001: Daniel E. Weeks
- 2002: Xihong Lin
- 2003: Michael Abbott Newton
- 2004: Mark van der Laan
- 2005: Rebecca Betensky
- 2006: Francesca Dominici
- 2007: David Dunson
- 2008: Hongyu Zhao
- 2009: Rafael Irizarry
- 2010: Nilanjan Chatterjee
- 2011: Sudipto Banerjee
- 2012: Amy Herring
- 2013: Debashis Ghosh
- 2014: Tyler VanderWeele
- 2015: John D. Storey
- 2016: Roger D. Peng
- 2017: Limin Peng
- 2018: Raphael Gottardo
- 2019: Daniela Witten
- 2020: Jeffrey T. Leek
- 2021: Sherri Rose
- 2022: Ryan Tibshirani
- 2023: Russell Shinohara
- 2024: Edward H. Kennedy
- 2025: Jingyi Jessica Li
