= Lessler =

Lessler is a surname. Notable people with the surname include:

- Judith T. Lessler (born 1943), American statistician and organic farmer
- Montague Lessler (1869–1938), American politician
- Nancy Lessler, American dancer, actor, and mural painter

== See also ==
- Lesser
