= Marvin Zelen =

Biostatistics researcher

- Born: June 21, 1927; New York, New York
- Died: November 15, 2014 (aged 87); Boston, Massachusetts
- Education: City College of New York, New York City, B.S., mathematics, 1949; University of North Carolina at Chapel Hill, M.S., mathematical statistics, 1951; American University, Ph.D., Statistics, 1957
- Known for: Zelen's randomized consent design (a.k.a. Zelen's design) study design
- Scientific career
- Fields: Statistics, biostatistics experimental design models
- Workplaces: Stevens Institute of Technology, 1951-1952 National Bureau of Standards (renamed National Institute of Standards & Technology), 1952-1961; University of Maryland, 1960-1961; National Cancer Institute, 1963-1967; State University of New York (Buffalo), 1967-1977; Frontier Science & Technology Research Foundation (Founmer); Dana–Farber Cancer Institute, * 1977-?? Harvard School of Public Health, Harvard University, 1977–2007; University of California, Berkeley - visiting University of Wisconsin - visiting Imperial College of Science & Technology (London) - visiting London School of Hygiene and Tropical Medicine (London) - visiting Hebrew University - visiting

Marvin Zelen (June 21, 1927 – November 15, 2014) was Professor Emeritus of Biostatistics in the Department of Biostatistics at the Harvard T.H. Chan School of Public Health (HSPH), and Lemuel Shattuck Research Professor of Statistical Science (the first recipient). During the 1980s, Zelen chaired HSPH's Department of Biostatistics. Among colleagues in the field of statistics, he was widely known as a leader who shaped the discipline of biostatistics. He "transformed clinical trial research into a statistically sophisticated branch of medical research."

Zelen was noted for his developing some of the statistical methods and study designs still used in clinical cancer trials, in which experimental drugs are tested for toxicity, effectiveness, and proper dosage. He introduced measures to ensure that data gathered from human trials would be as free as possible of errors and biases—measures that are now standard practice. Zelen helped transform clinical trial research into a well-managed and statistically sophisticated branch of medical science. His work in this area led to significant medical advances, such as improved treatments for several different forms of cancer. His research also focused on improved early detection of cancer; on modeling the progression of cancer and its response to treatment; and on using statistical models to help determine optimal screening strategies for various common cancers, especially breast cancer. Ironically, he died after a prolonged battle with cancer.

One of those experimental design models for randomized clinical trials is known as Zelen's design or Zelen's randomized consent design, in which patients are randomized to either the treatment or to the control group before they give their informed consent. Because the group to which any given patient is assigned is known at the time of consenting, the study patient's consent can be sought conditionally.

In 1962 Zelen was elected as a Fellow of the American Statistical Association.

== Education ==
- Diploma - Evander Childs High School, New York City, 1944
- B.S. - City College of New York, New York City, mathematics, 1949
- M.S. - University of North Carolina at Chapel Hill, mathematical statistics, 1951
- Ph.D. - American University, Statistics, 1957

== Work History ==
- 1951-1952 - Stevens Institute of Technology, Hoboken, New Jersey
- 1952-1961 - National Bureau of Standards (renamed National Institute of Standards & Technology)
- 1960-1961 - University of Maryland (College Park), Associate Professor
- 1961-1963 - University of Wisconsin’s Mathematics Research Center
- 1963-1967 - National Cancer Institute, Bethesda, MD [Chair, Section on Statistics and Applied Mathematics]
- 1967-1977 - State University of New York (Buffalo), Professor and Leading Professor
- 1975 - Founder, President, Chairman of Board, Frontier Science & Technology Research Foundation (a notfor–profit foundation devoted to the advancement of statistical science in clinical trials)
- 1977-2014 - Dana–Farber Cancer Institute, Professor of Statistical Science [Chair, Department of Biostatistical Science (DFCI)]
- 1977–2007 - Harvard School of Public Health, Professor of Statistical Science [Chair, HSPH Department of Biostatistics (1981-1990)]
- 2007-2014 - Harvard School of Public Health, Lemuel Shattuck Research Professor of Statistical Science (established by Derek Bok)

Visiting faculty member:

- University of California, Berkeley
- University of Wisconsin - early 1960s (2 years, from 1961 to 1963)
- Imperial College of Science & Technology (London) - Fulbright Scholar
- London School of Hygiene and Tropical Medicine (London)
- Hebrew University

== Early life and career before Harvard ==
Marvin Zelen was born and reared in New York City, where he attended and in 1944 received a diploma from Evander Childs High School. Then, as a mathematics major at City College of New York, he discovered and developed his lifelong interest in statistics and probability. In 1949, he earned his bachelor's degree in mathematics there. After earning a master's degree in mathematical statistics from the University of North Carolina at Chapel Hill in 1951, he worked for 10 years at the mathematics lab of the National Bureau of Standards in Washington, D.C. He was the only math lab employee without a doctorate, which he later earned in 1957 at American University.

In the early 1960s, Zelen spent two years (1961-1963) as a visiting professor at the University of Wisconsin’s Mathematics Research Center, where he first worked with cancer researchers, helping them address problems with study design. After that, for four years beginning in 1963, he led the National Cancer Institute’s applied mathematics and statistics section, where he delved further into cancer and clinical research. He spent a year in London as a Fulbright Scholar, and then he joined the biostatistics department at the State University of New York in Buffalo, now University at Buffalo.

During his 10 years in Buffalo, Zelen helped the Eastern Cooperative Oncology Group (ECOG) — one of several regional organizations established by the National Cancer Institute (NCI) to test experimental cancer treatments — with its studies. In an American University alumni magazine article in 2008, Zelen said those early studies were “terrible.” He said the studies were “poorly thought out; the data was wrong; they had poor quality control, not enough patients — everything you can think of that was antiscientific.” He urged biomedical researchers in charge of the studies to begin from scratch because they had learned relatively little because of study design flaws. They agreed with Zelen, and along with his longtime collaborator Paul Carbone, he established research standards and practice now used in clinical trials for many infectious diseases. During that period, Zelen formed the Statistical Laboratory at the University of Buffalo, which focused on overseeing and improving statistical aspects of large, complex drug trials. ECOG would later become one of the world's largest programs for testing and evaluating various cancer treatments.

Zelen was also prominent in President Richard Nixon’s “war on cancer” during the early 1970s. He was chair of a committee responsible for designing and organizing the new program. Lee-Jen Wei, HSPH biostatistics professor, called Zelen's involvement in the early war on cancer “tremendous and lasting.”

== Academic career at Harvard ==
In the mid-1970s, Zelen's pioneering work in Buffalo brought him to the attention of HSPH's then-biostatistics chair, Frederick Mosteller. Zelen insisted that he would only come to Harvard if he could bring the biostatistics team which he had built in Buffalo, since he wanted to build the world's greatest biostatistics department wherever he went. Thus, in 1977, 27 faculty, researchers, and other staff members moved from Buffalo to Boston, along with their DEC-20 computer and their research projects, the ECOG trials — 150 cancer trials involving several thousand patients. Zelen's lab was established at the Dana–Farber Cancer Institute, where, simultaneously with his tenure at HSPH, he built the Dana–Farber Cancer Institute’s Department of Biostatistics and Computational Biology.

Zelen’s colleague and successor (as Department Chair), biostatistics professor Nan Laird, recalled that “those first few years of integrating twelve new faculty members from Buffalo with half as many from Harvard were part of Marvin’s grand plan to make Harvard the nation's leading biostatistics department — ...It was an enormously exciting time when we were united in working towards a common goal. Marvin’s genius was that he got all of us involved, then stepped back and gave us all the credit. ”

Zelen served for a decade in the 1980s (1981-1990) as chair of the Harvard School of Public Health's Department of Biostatistics, where he has been credited with transforming HSPH's biostatistics department into the best biostatistics department in the United States. He was also a member of the Faculty of Arts and Sciences at Harvard University, in the FAS Department of Statistics in Harvard Square, and voted to remain an Emeritus Professor there, also, until his death in late 2014.

In 2007, Zelen became the first holder of the newly named (by Harvard President Derek Bok) Lemuel Shattuck Research Professor of Statistical Science at HSPH.

Zelen was known for developing the statistical methods and study designs that are used in clinical cancer trials, in which experimental drugs are tested for toxicity, effectiveness, and proper dosage. He also introduced measures to ensure that data from the trials are as free as possible of errors and biases—measures that are now standard practice. Prof. Zelen helped transform clinical trial research into a well-managed and statistically sophisticated branch of medical science. His work in this area has led to significant medical advances, such as improved treatments for several different forms of cancer. His research also focused on improved early detection of cancer; on modeling the progression of cancer and its response to treatment; and on using statistical models to help determine optimal screening strategies for various common cancers, especially breast cancer.

Mitchell H. Gail, MD, PhD, senior investigator in the biostatistics branch of NCI's Division of Cancer Epidemiology and Genetics and president of the American Statistical Association (1995), commented:

Marvin had a lot of guts and a vision for what was important. He finagled NCI into supporting the use of DEC-10 (PDP-10) computers in clinical trials, long before the study section supported it. He inspired the clinical trials community of statisticians.

On a more personal level, Zelen's colleague and successor Laird said that

[Prof. Zelen was] a tremendous force in my personal and professional life. He was always in and out of my office, asking how things were going. Even as he was trying to convince me to do something I absolutely did not want to do, I always felt his intentions for me were the best. Marvin was always honest and unpretentious.

In 1981, Zelen succeeded Frederick Mosteller as Biostatistics Chair. He continued working on the ECOG trials, helped lay the groundwork for the department's pre-eminence in AIDS clinical trials, and improved the biostatistics curriculum. As its chair, he helped propel the department to its position as a leading center for biostatistical research.

Zelen also achieved another level of fame in the early 1980s when he and his late colleague (died 2009) in the biostatistics department, Stephen Lagakos, launched a study of a possible connection between a cluster of childhood leukemia cases in Woburn and the town's water supply. Known as the Harvard Health Study, the investigation showed, for the first time, a connection between Woburn's contaminated water and a variety of adverse health effects, including leukemia. The matter made headlines, wound up in court, and was chronicled in the book A Civil Action, which was later made into a movie. As the book notes, when Prof. Zelen announced the study's results in the basement of a Woburn church in February 1984, someone in the audience called out, “Thank God for Marvin Zelen,” and the crowd burst into applause.

Another of Zelen's achievements was his establishment, in 1975, of the Frontier Science and Technology Research Foundation in Boston, a nonprofit devoted to advancing the use of statistical science and practice and data management techniques in science, health care, and education. Prof. Zelen served as president, and his wife Thelma was chief administrative officer. Several of his other close friends and Harvard colleagues were also directly involved. Richard D. Gelber, professor of biostatistics of HSPH and at DFCI, and winner of the 2008 Komen Brinker Award for Scientific Distinction, noted:

This is another excellent example of how Marvin established an environment within which others could flourish. Thelma’s contributions to Marvin’s success cannot be overlooked. Their partnership is a role model of working together, and she has been a major force in the formation and administrative leadership of Frontier Science as its chief operating officer for almost 40 years.

During the past 39 years, Marvin taught me much about the importance of collaborative research, and how progress is fueled by statistical and clinical scientists working together as partners.

Fellow biostatisticians from around the country—people like Jack Kalbfleisch from the University of Michigan, Ross Prentice from the Fred Hutchinson Cancer Research Center, and Norman Breslow from the University of Washington - have all spoken of Zelen's huge influence. Said Kalbfleisch, “Marvin was a tremendous force in the profession and a great mentor to so many of his colleagues and students.” Prentice said Prof. Zelen “did much to define the biostatistical profession.” Breslow said he was “greatly influenced by Marvin and his work.”

Again, Mitchell H. Gail of National Cancer Institute recalled:

So many people were helped by Marvin, whether they needed assistance with starting a company, with a personal matter, or with ideas and guidance in academic statistics. That is truly a legacy to be proud of.

Zelen was survived by his wife, Thelma Geier Zelen, and their two daughters, Deborah and Sandy Zelen, and by two grandsons, Matthew and Toby Mues.

== Honors and awards ==
- Zelen has received numerous awards and honors. His work has been recognized around the world through awards and other accolades. He has received numerous awards, among them from ASA, ISI, IMS; he is a fellow of the American Academy of Arts and Sciences. In 1997, in honor of his 70th birthday, the School established the annual Marvin Zelen Leadership Award in Statistical Science, which has become one of the most prestigious awards in the field, meant to reflect Prof. Zelen's contributions to quantitative science and beyond. The Marvin Zelen Leadership Award in Statistical Science, Awarded annually by the American Statistical Association. The Awards Committee is in the Biostatistics Department of the Harvard School of Public Health in Boston. They administer three other major annual statistical awards, in the spirit of Zelen's aspirations to make the HSPH Biostatistics Department number one among the world's academic biostatistics departments.

Awardees:
- 2014 - Xiao-Li Meng, PhD, Dean of the Graduate School of Arts & Sciences and Whipple V.N. Jones Professor of Statistics at Harvard University, "Personalized Treatment: Sounds heavenly, but where on Earth did they find the right guinea pig for me?"
- 2013 - John J. Crowley, PhD, President and CEO of Cancer Research And Biostatistics (CRAB), “A Brief History of Survival Analysis”
- 2012 - Nicholas P. Jewell, Professor, Division of Biostatistics, School of Public Health; Professor, Department of Statistics, University of California, Berkeley, “Counting Civilian Casualties”
- 2011 - J. Richard Landis, “Methods for Investigating Agreement & Concordance: with Applications in the Biomedical Sciences”
- 2010 - Ingram Olkin, Professor and Chair Emeritus of statistics and education at Stanford University and the Stanford Graduate School of Education, for developing statistical analysis for evaluating policies, particularly in education, and for his contributions to meta-analysis, statistics education, multivariate analysis, and majorization theory, “Measures of Heterogeneity. Diversity and Inequality”
- 2009 - David L. DeMets, “Challenges in Clinical Trials; Some Old and Some New”
- 2008 - Norman E. Breslow, for developing and popularizing case-control matched sample research designs, with co-author Nicholas Day, in their two-volume work Statistical Methods in Cancer Research, “The Case-Control Study: Origins, Modern Conception and Newly Available Methods of Analysis”
- 2007 - Scott L. Zeger, cofounder of journal Biostatistics, “The Symbiosis of Statistical Science and Biomedicine: Past and Future”
- 2006 - Mitchell H. Gail, Past President (1995), American Statistical Association, “Absolute Risk: Clinical Applications and Controversies”
- 2005 - Ross L. Prentice, “Chronic Disease Prevention: Research Strategies and Needs”
- 2004 - Robert C. Elston, “The Analysis of Case-Control Data to Detect Candidate Genes”
- 2003 - Wayne Fuller, “Analytic Studies with Complex Survey Data”
- 2002 - Robert O’Neill, “A Perspective on the Development and Future on Statistics at the FDA”
- 2001 - Niels Keiding, “Event Histories and Their Analysis”
- 2000 - Lincoln E. Moses, “Deciding Whether Large Clinical Trials and Meta-analyses (deceased) Agree or Not”
- 1999 - John W. Tukey, “A Smorgasbord of Handy Techniques That Can Help in (deceased) Analyzing Data”
- 1998 - Sir David Roxbee Cox, “Graphical Models in Statistics: A Review”
- 1997 - Frederick Mosteller, (former) Chair, Department of Biostatistics, Harvard School of Public Health, “The Importance of Clinical Trials in Education” (deceased)

- Elected Fellow of the American Academy of Arts and Sciences (AAAS)
- Member, American Association for the Advancement of Science
- American Statistical Association (ASA)
- Institute of Mathematical Statistics
- ???? - Lecturer, Mortimer and Raymond Sackler Institute of Advanced Studies, Tel Aviv University, Ramat Aviv, Tel Aviv 69978, Israel.
- 1965-1966 - Fulbright Senior Lecturer Award (United Kingdom)
- 1966 - Washington Academy of Science Award for distinguished work in mathematics
- 1996 - Clair and Richard Morse Award for outstanding achievement in advancing cancer research
- 2003 - Docteur, Honoris Causa (honorary doctoral degree), Universite Victor Segalen Bordeaux II, France
- 2004 - A special issue of the journal Lifetime Data Analysis was dedicated to him.
- 2006 - Samuel S. Wilks Memorial Award, American Statistical Association
- 2007 - R.A. Fisher Lectureship, Fisher Lecturer Award, Committee of the Presidents of the Statistical Society (COPSS), in recognition of his outstanding contributions to statistical science. Award Lecture: "The early detection of disease: Statistical challenges"
- 2007 - Awarded newly-established Lemuel Shattuck Research Professorship in Statistical Science, established and named by Harvard President Derek Bok, effective September 1, 2007
- 2007 - Lifetime Achievement Award (International Indian Statistical Association)
- 2008 - Emanuel & Carol Prize for Statistical Innovation (Texas A&M University)
- 2008 - Parzen Prize Lecture, with Nancy Reid, Department of Statistics, Texas A&M University
- 2009 (November 11) - Medal of Honor, American Cancer Society’s highest honor, in recognition of his accomplishments in Cancer Research (November 2009).
- 2012 - Karl E. Peace award for "Outstanding Statistical Contributions for the Betterment of Society"

Symposia

- Three symposia have been held around the world in Zelen's honor:

- 1 - 2007 (January 23–25) - International Biometric Society (EMR-IBS), 1st day of the 4th meeting of the Eastern Mediterranean Region at the Hilton Hotel, Eilat, Israel, was a dedicated symposium for Dr. Marvin Zelen
- 2 - 2010 (October 2–3) - Lagakos' Symposium, Athens, Greece - "Impact of Biostatistical Science - Advances in Research: AIDS, Cancer, Environment"
- 3 - 2013 (November 25) - Play the Winner: Honoring the Scientific Achievements of Marvin Zelen, Simmons College, Boston, MA

- Fellow, American Academy of Arts and Sciences

== Boards, chairmanship, and professional service ==
- Cytel (provider of biostatistics and operations research software and service knowledge)
- 1997-2000 - Chair, Committee of Presidents of Statistical Societies (COPSS)

== Collegial praise ==
Current HSPH biostatistics chair Victor de Gruttola said

Scientists from around the world have benefited from Dr. Zelen’s innovative ideas and transformative effect on biomedical research, but those of us associated with the Harvard Department of Biostatistics are particularly grateful for Dr. Zelen’s commitment to educating students and advancing the careers of junior scientists.

== Bibliography ==
Zelen has had work published in more than 150 publications. The most complete list published in one place is on his profile page in the Harvard Catalyst.

- Mandelblatt, JS; Cronin, KA; Berry, DA; Chang, Y; de Koning, HJ; Lee, SJ; Plevritis, SK; Schechter, CB; Stout, NK; van Ravesteyn, NT; Zelen, M; Feuer, EJ (Oct 2011). "Modeling the impact of population screening on breast cancer mortality in the United States". Breast. 20 (Suppl 3): S75–81. doi:10.1016/S0960-9776(11)70299-5. PMC 3457919. PMID 22015298.
- Kalager, M; Zelen, M; Langmark, F; Adami, HO (Sep 2010). "Effect of screening mammography on breast-cancer mortality in Norway". N Engl J Med. 363 (13): 1203–10. doi:10.1056/NEJMoa1000727. PMID 20860502.
- Mandelblatt, JS; Cronin, KA; Bailey, S; Berry, DA; de Koning, HJ; Draisma, G; Huang, H; Lee, SJ; Munsell, M; Plevritis, SK; Ravdin, P; Schechter, CB; Sigal, B; Stoto, MA; Stout, NK; van Ravesteyn, NT; Venier, J; Zelen, M; Feuer, EJ (Nov 2009). "Effects of mammography screening under different screening schedules: model estimates of potential benefits and harms". Ann Intern Med. 151 (10): 738–47. doi:10.7326/0003-4819-151-10-200911170-00010. PMC 3515682. PMID 19920274.
- Lee, SJ; Zelen, M (Jun 2008). "Mortality modeling of early detection programs". Biometrics. 64 (2): 386–95. doi:10.1111/j.1541-0420.2007.00893.x. PMID 17725809. S2CID 21942399.
- Zelen, M (Oct 2006). "Biostatisticians, biostatistical science and the future". Stat Med. 25 (20): 3409–14. doi:10.1002/sim.2658. PMID 16927436. S2CID 37017509.
- Lee, S; Zelen, M (2006). "A stochastic model for predicting the mortality of breast cancer". J Natl Cancer Inst Monogr. 2006 (36): 79–86. doi:10.1093/jncimonographs/lgj011. PMID 17032897.
- Zelen, M (Nov 2005). "Risks of cancer and families". J Natl Cancer Inst. 97 (21): 1556–7. doi:10.1093/jnci/dji386. PMID 16264169.
- Berry, DA; Cronin, KA; Plevritis, SK; Fryback, DG; Clarke, L; Zelen, M; Mandelblatt, JS; Yakovlev, AY; Habbema, JD; Feuer, EJ (Oct 2005). "Effect of screening and adjuvant therapy on mortality from breast cancer". N Engl J Med. 353 (17): 1784–92. doi:10.1056/NEJMoa050518. hdl:1765/60626. PMID 16251534. S2CID 72293508.
- Shen, Y; Zelen, M (Oct 2005). "Robust modeling in screening studies: estimation of sensitivity and preclinical sojourn time distribution". Biostatistics. 6 (4): 604–14. doi:10.1093/biostatistics/kxi030. PMID 15860542.
- Hu, P; Zelen, M (Dec 2004). "Planning of randomized early detection trials". Stat Methods Med Res. 13 (6): 491–506. doi:10.1191/0962280204sm379ra. PMID 15587435. S2CID 12838050.
- Lee, S; Huang, H; Zelen, M (Dec 2004). "Early detection of disease and scheduling of screening examinations". Stat Methods Med Res. 13 (6): 443–56. doi:10.1191/0962280204sm377ra. PMID 15587433. S2CID 23568222.
- Zelen, M (Dec 2004). "Forward and backward recurrence times and length biased sampling: age specific models". Lifetime Data Anal. 10 (4): 325–34. doi:10.1007/s10985-004-4770-1. PMID 15690988. S2CID 22077626.
- Davidov, O; Zelen, M (Oct 2004). "Overdiagnosis in early detection programs". Biostatistics. 5 (4): 603–13. doi:10.1093/biostatistics/kxh012. PMID 15475422.
- Zelen, M (Nov 2003). "The training of biostatistical scientists". Stat Med. 22 (21): 3427–30. doi:10.1002/sim.1642. PMID 14566925. S2CID 2902071.
- Lee, SJ; Zelen, M (Aug 2003). "Modelling the early detection of breast cancer". Ann Oncol. 14 (8): 1199–202. doi:10.1093/annonc/mdg323. PMID 12881377.
- Davidov, O; Zelen, M (Jul 2003). "The theory of case-control studies for early detection programs". Biostatistics. 4 (3): 411–21. doi:10.1093/biostatistics/4.3.411. PMID 12925508.
- Hu, P; Zelen, M (Sep 2002). "Experimental design issues for the early detection of disease: novel designs". Biostatistics. 3 (3): 299–313. doi:10.1093/biostatistics/3.3.299. PMID 12933599.
- Parmigiani, G; Skates, S; Zelen, M (Mar 2002). "Modeling and optimization in early detection programs with a single exam". Biometrics. 58 (1): 30–6. doi:10.1111/j.0006-341x.2002.00030.x. PMID 11890325. S2CID 38228527.
- Lee, SJ; Zelen, M (2002). "Statistical Models for Screening: Planning Public Health Programs". Biostatistical Applications in Cancer Research. Cancer Treatment and Research. Vol. 113. pp. 19–36. doi:10.1007/978-1-4757-3571-0_2. ISBN 978-1-4419-5310-0. PMID 12613348.
- Zelen, M; Lee, SJ (2002). "Models and the Early Detection of Disease: Methodological Considerations". Biostatistical Applications in Cancer Research. Cancer Treatment and Research. Vol. 113. pp. 1–18. doi:10.1007/978-1-4757-3571-0_1. ISBN 978-1-4419-5310-0. PMID 12613347.
- Shen, Y; Wu, D; Zelen, M (Dec 2001). "Testing the independence of two diagnostic tests". Biometrics. 57 (4): 1009–17. doi:10.1111/j.0006-341x.2001.01009.x. PMID 11764239. S2CID 44418704.
- Shen, Y; Zelen, M (Aug 2001). "Screening sensitivity and sojourn time from breast cancer early detection clinical trials: mammograms and physical examinations". J Clin Oncol. 19 (15): 3490–9. doi:10.1200/jco.2001.19.15.3490. PMID 11481355.
- Nam, CM; Zelen, M (Mar 2001). "Comparing the survival of two groups with an intermediate clinical event". Lifetime Data Anal. 7 (1): 5–19. doi:10.1023/a:1009609925212. PMID 11280847. S2CID 35837296.
- Davidov, O; Zelen, M (Aug 2000). "Designing cancer prevention trials: a stochastic model approach". Stat Med. 19 (15): 1983–95. doi:10.1002/1097-0258(20000815)19:15<1983::aid-sim534>3.0.co;2-e. PMID 10900447.
- Wallace, BC; Zelen, M; Zani Pacheco, CL (Dec 1998). "Milk leakage in nonlactating women: a randomized clinical trial evaluating a polyvinyl chloride device versus disposable breast pads". J Women's Health. 7 (10): 1283–8. doi:10.1089/jwh.1998.7.1283. PMID 9929861.

== See also ==
- American Cancer Society
- Breast Cancer
- Cluster randomised controlled trial
- Mammography
- Randomization
- Stochastic model
