= Demoralization =

Demoralization can be:

- Decadence, decay of morality
- Demoralization (warfare), damaging an enemy's fighting spirit
- Resentful demoralization, a phenomenon in clinical research
