= Stephen Lagakos =

American biostatistician (1946–2009)

Stephen W. Lagakos
- Born: June 18, 1946; Philadelphia, Pennsylvania, US
- Died: October 12, 2009 (aged 63) near Peterborough, New Hampshire, US

Academic background
- Education: Carnegie Mellon University; George Washington University
- Thesis: Hypothesis testing for a time series analog of the general linear model (1972)
- Doctoral advisor: Robert H. Shumway
- Other advisor: Marvin Zelen

Academic work
- Institutions: University at Buffalo; Harvard University
- Doctoral students: Beth Ann Griffin; Debbie Cheng
- Notable students: Danyu Lin

Stephen William Lagakos (June 18, 1946 – October 12, 2009) was an American biostatistician renowned for his pioneering contributions to AIDS clinical trials research and environmental health statistics. His investigation into the leukemia cluster in Woburn, Massachusetts with Marvin Zelen became the basis for the book and film A Civil Action. His research helped transform HIV/AIDS from a fatal diagnosis into a manageable condition through improved treatment protocols and prevention strategies.

== Education and career ==
Lagakos earned a BS in statistics from Carnegie Mellon University in 1968. In the same year, he also married Regina Eckenrode. He continued his graduate studies at George Washington University, where he completed his Ph.D. in 1972 under the direction of Robert H. Shumway with a dissertation titled "Hypothesis Testing for a Time Series Analog of the General Linear Model". Lagakos worked under Marvin Zelen at SUNY Buffalo after graduation. When Zelen moved to Harvard School of Public Health in 1977, Lagakos also joined the Harvard faculty as an assistant professor along with the rest of the team at Buffalo, just before the emergence of the AIDS epidemic. During the early 1980s, his collaboration with Marvin Zelen on environmental health research has captured national attention. This include the investigation of childhood leukemia cases in Woburn, Massachusetts, which demonstrated for the first time a connection between the town's contaminated water supply and various adverse health outcomes, including leukemia. From 1982 to 1987, he served as co-director of the World Health Organization's Collaborating Center for Cancer Biostatistics Evaluation. He was appointed chair of the Department of Biostatistics in 1999 and served until 2007. During this period, the department expanded its research into infectious diseases, psychiatric statistics, and statistical genetics. He also founded the Center for Biostatistics in AIDS Research at Harvard from 1995 to 2009.

Lagakos designed and analyzed studies investigating HIV transmission from mothers to children and developed sophisticated methods to improve the accuracy of estimated HIV incidence rates. He served as a statistical consultant to the New England Journal of Medicine from 1997 until his death. Lagakos also contributed to expanding antiretroviral drug access in developing countries and organized a supplementary reading group for fellows in the McGoldrick biostatistics fellowship program in AIDS research.

== Honors and awards ==
Lagakos received the Mortimer Spiegelman Award from the American Public Health Association in 1984. In 2006, he was awarded an honorary doctorate from the National and Kapodistrian University of Athens. Lagakos was an elected member of the Institute of Medicine, the American Association for the Advancement of Science, and the American Statistical Association.

== Death and legacy ==
In 2009, Lagakos died in an automobile accident on Route 202 in New Hampshire at the age of 63, along with his wife Regina and mother Helen.

Following his death, the Harvard T.H. Chan School of Public Health established the annual Lagakos Distinguished Alumni Award in his memory to recognize alumni whose research and teaching have significantly impacted statistical science.
