= Colin Begg =

Colin Begg may refer to:

- Colin Begg (politician) (1917–1984), Australian politician and judge
- Colin Begg (statistician), Scottish statistician
