= ICH E9(R1) addendum on estimands and sensitivity analyses in clinical trials =

In 2020, the International Council for Harmonisation of Technical Requirements for Pharmaceuticals for Human Use (ICH) introduced the ICH E9(R1) addendum on estimands and sensitivity analyses in clinical trials to their guidance on statistical principals in clinical trials.

The addendum was intended to address longstanding issues around of ambiguity in terms of the precise treatment effect being estimated in a clinical trials. The addendum sets out a framework for defining estimands, and using estimands to align trial methods to the overall trial objectives.

== Estimand and attributes ==
An estimand is a precise description of the treatment effect a trial sets out to estimate. The ICH E9(R1) addendum provides 5 attributes that comprise the estimand: (i) population of patients targeted by the clinical question; (ii) treatment condition; (iii) endpoint/outcome variable; (iv) population-level summary measure; and (v) strategies to handle intercurrent events.

== Intercurrent events ==
Intercurrent events are typically defined as post-randomisation events that affect either the interpretation or existence of the endpoint/outcome variable. In pharmaceutical trials, these frequently include events such as failure to receive any dose of study medication, early discontinuation of study medication, or use of rescue therapy.

The ICH E9(R1) addendum lists 5 strategies that can be used to address intercurrent events within the estimand definition: (i) treatment policy; (ii) composite; (iii) while on treatment/while alive; (iv) hypothetical; and (v) principal stratum.

Under a treatment policy strategy "The occurrence of the intercurrent event is considered irrelevant in defining the treatment effect of interest: the value for the variable of interest is used regardless of whether or not the intercurrent event occurs."

Under a composite strategy the "intercurrent event is considered in itself to be informative about the patient's outcome and is therefore incorporated into the definition of the variable."

Under a while on treatment strategy the "response to treatment prior to the occurrence of the intercurrent event is of interest."

Under a hypothetical strategy "A scenario is envisaged in which the intercurrent event would not occur: the value of the variable to reflect the clinical question of interest is the value which the variable would have taken in the hypothetical scenario defined."

Under a principal stratum strategy "The target population might be taken to be the 'principal stratum' (see Glossary) in which an intercurrent event would occur."

Tutorial papers have been written to provide further explanation on estimands and intercurrent event strategies.

== Uptake ==
The framework has been adopted by numerous medicine regulators worldwide such as FDA (Food and Drug Administration, United States), MHRA (Medicines & Healthcare products Regulatory Agency, UK) and EMA (European Medicines Agency, Europe).

== CRT-Estimands Framework ==
The ICH E9(R1) addendum was primarily developed with individually randomised design in mind. Additional challenges in describing treatment effects can occur in other settings, such as cluster randomised trials. On this basis, a consensus-based extension of the ICH E9(R1) addendum for cluster randomised trials (the CRT-Estimands Framework) has been developed, which lists an amended set of attributes that should be described when defining estimands for cluster randomised trials.

=== Introduction and motivation ===
The International Conference on Harmonisation (ICH) released the ICH E9(R1) Addendum On Estimands and Sensitivity Analyses in Clinical Trials in 2020 which set out a framework for defining estimands – a precise description of the treatment effect to be estimated in a trial. However, the ICH E9(R1) addendum was primarily developed with individually randomised trials in mind, and since its publication there has been emerging evidence that cluster randomised trials (CRTs) have additional challenges for defining estimands.

In response to this, the CRT-Estimands Framework was developed. It is a consensus-based extension of the ICH E9(R1) framework for cluster randomised trials. It lists 5 attributes that need to be described when defining estimands for cluster randomised trials.

=== Development process ===
The framework was developed using standard consensus methods, including: (i) a scoping review; (ii) an international Delphi study; (iii) and a consensus meeting of international experts.

=== The CRT-estimands framework ===
The CRT-Estimands Framework provides 5 attributes that should be described when defining estimands in cluster randomised trials:

1. Population of individuals and clusters
2. Treatment conditions
3. Endpoint/outcome variable
4. Strategies to handle individual and cluster level intercurrent events
5. Population-level summary measure, including how individuals and clusters are weighted (e.g. individual-average), and whether summaries are marginal or cluster-specific, if applicable
