= Alisa Stephens-Shields =

American biostatistician

Alisa J. Stephens-Shields is an American biostatistician whose research focuses on the statistics of clinical trials, including cluster-randomised controlled trials, longitudinal data, semiparametric models, and causal inference. She is an associate professor of biostatistics in the Perelman School of Medicine at the University of Pennsylvania, where she has been a collaborator on studies on pelvic pain and on the effects of testosterone treatment on older men. She also holds an adjunct faculty position at Harvard University.

== Early life and education ==
Stephens-Shields is African American. She grew up as the youngest of three children in Teaneck, New Jersey. Her father, who grew up nearby, worked as a civil engineer, and her mother was an immigrant from Jamaica. She enjoyed playing computer puzzle games as a teenager, and after graduating from Teaneck High School, she majored in mathematics, with a minor in Spanish, as an undergraduate at the University of Maryland, College Park. Her interest in biostatistics and public health began in her junior year, and continued with a research project at Rutgers University the following summer, and a senior-year internship at the National Cancer Institute. After graduating in 2006, and six months of community service in Costa Rica, she continued her studies in statistics in the Harvard T.H. Chan School of Public Health at Harvard University. She received a master's degree there in 2009, and completed her Ph.D. in 2012.

== Recognition ==
Stephens-Shields was named to the Leadership Academy of the Committee of Presidents of Statistical Societies in 2021. She was named as a Fellow of the American Statistical Association in 2023. She was the recipient of the 2024 Myrto Lefkopoulou Distinguished Lectureship at the Harvard T.H. Chan School of Public Health.
