= Danyu Lin =

Chinese-American biostatistician

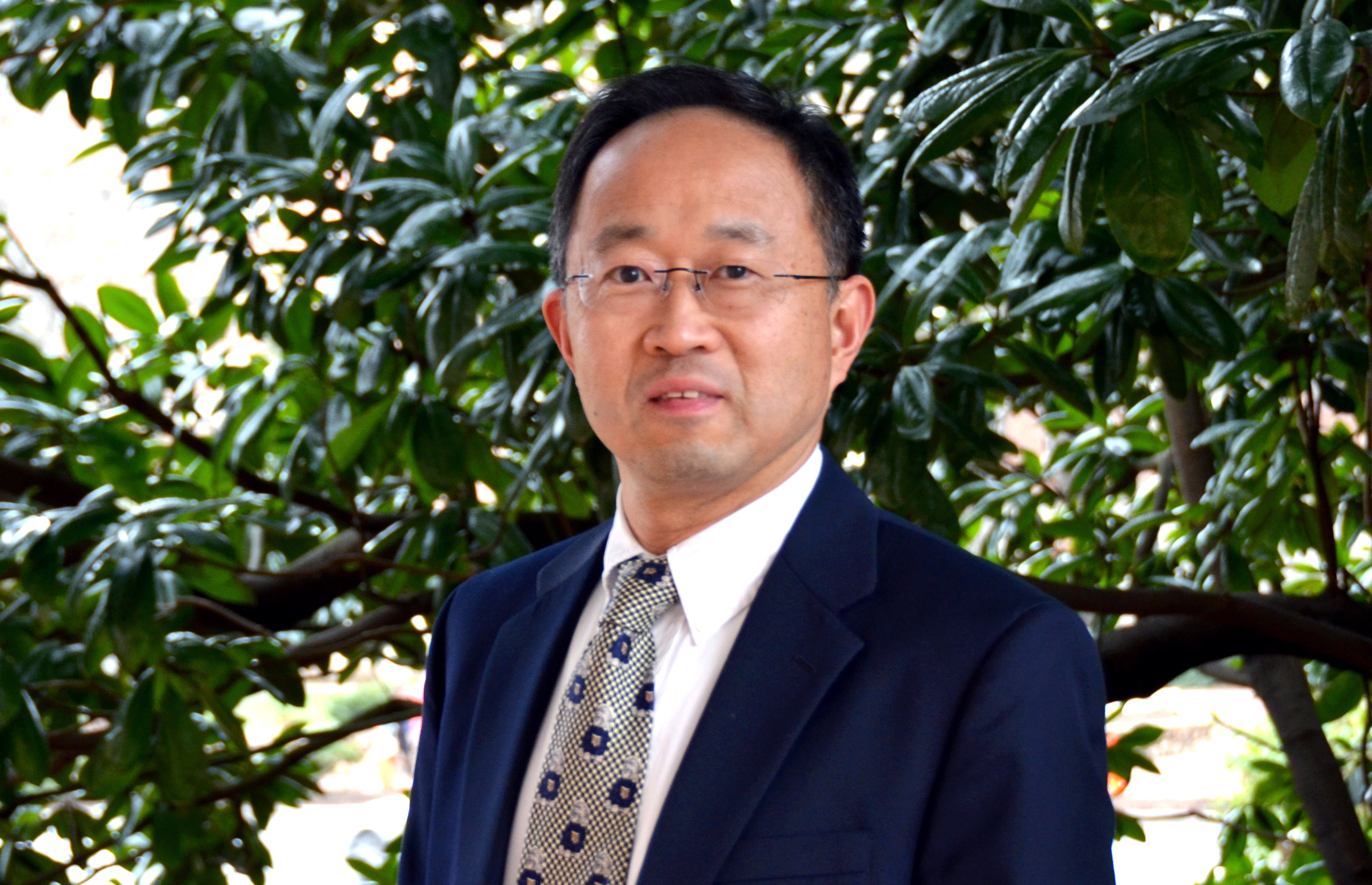
- Lin in 2020
- Other names: Dan-Yu Lin, D. Y. Lin
- Education: B.S. 1983, Geography, East China Normal University Ph.D. 1989, Biostatistics, University of Michigan
- Scientific career
- Fields: Biostatistics
- Workplaces: University of North Carolina at Chapel Hill; University of Washington
- Thesis: Goodness-of-fit tests and robust statistical inference for the Cox proportional hazards model
- Doctoral advisor: Lee-Jen Wei
- Website: https://dlin.web.unc.edu/

Danyu Lin (Chinese: 林丹瑜) is a Chinese-American biostatistician known for his contributions to survival analysis, statistical genetics, and infectious diseases. He is currently the Dennis Gillings Distinguished Professor of Biostatistics at the University of North Carolina at Chapel Hill.

== Research ==
Lin's early work in survival analysis focused on marginal models for multivariate failure time data, robust inference, and model checking. The statistical methods he developed have been incorporated into major textbooks and software packages (SAS, R, Stata, SUDDAN) and used in thousands of scientific studies. Lin also conducted groundbreaking research in semiparametric additive risks models and accelerated failure time models. Over the last two decades, Lin has made major theoretical and computational advances in nonparametric maximum likelihood estimation of transformation models, random-effects models, and interval-censored data.

Lin has made seminal contributions to statistical genetics. His finding that meta-analysis of summary statistics is equivalent to joint analysis of individual-participant data has enabled geneticists around the world to discover hundreds of thousands of genetic variants associated with thousands of complex human diseases and traits through meta-analyses of genome-wide association studies and next-generation sequencing studies. He also pioneered the use of score statistics in genetic association studies, which substantially speeds up computation for genome-wide association tests.

Lin made important contributions to the prevention and treatment of COVID-19 by characterizing the time-varying effects of vaccines and prior infections, as well as the benefits of antiviral drugs and immunomodulatory agents. His high-profile publications (5 in New England Journal of Medicine, 3 in JAMA journals, and 2 in The Lancet journals) have been viewed over 1 million times; cited by the U.S. Food and Drug Administration, Centers for Disease Control and Prevention, and the World Health Organization; and reported by The New York Times, The Washington Post, The US News, The Associated Press, The Wall Street Journal, NBC News, Science, Scientific American, and Australian Broadcasting Corporation.

== Career ==
Lin received his Ph.D. in biostatistics in 1989 from the University of Michigan, where he was supervised by Lee-Jen Wei. After one-year postdoctoral training with Stephen Lagakos at Harvard University, he joined the biostatistics faculty at the University of Washington, where he was promoted to associate professor in 1994 and to professor in 1998. He also held a joint appointment with the Fred Hutchinson Cancer Research Center. Lin moved to the University of North Carolina at Chapel Hill at the end of 2000 to become the Dennis Gillings Distinguished Professor of Biostatistics.

Lin served as an associate editor for numerous statistical journals, including Biometrics (1997–2000), Biometrika (1999–2023), Journal of the American Statistical Association (2012–2023). He also served as a special government employee (consultant) to the U.S. Food and Drug Administration. He currently serves on the editorial boards of Genetic Epidemiology and Vaccines and as a statistical reviewer for The Lancet Infectious Diseases.

== Honors and awards ==
- Mortimer Spiegelman Award, American Public Health Association, 1999
- Fellow, Institute of Mathematical Statistics, 1999
- Fellow, American Statistical Association, 2000
- George W. Snedecor Award, Committee of Presidents of Statistical Societies, 2015
