= DNA programmed assembly of cells =

Microbiological process

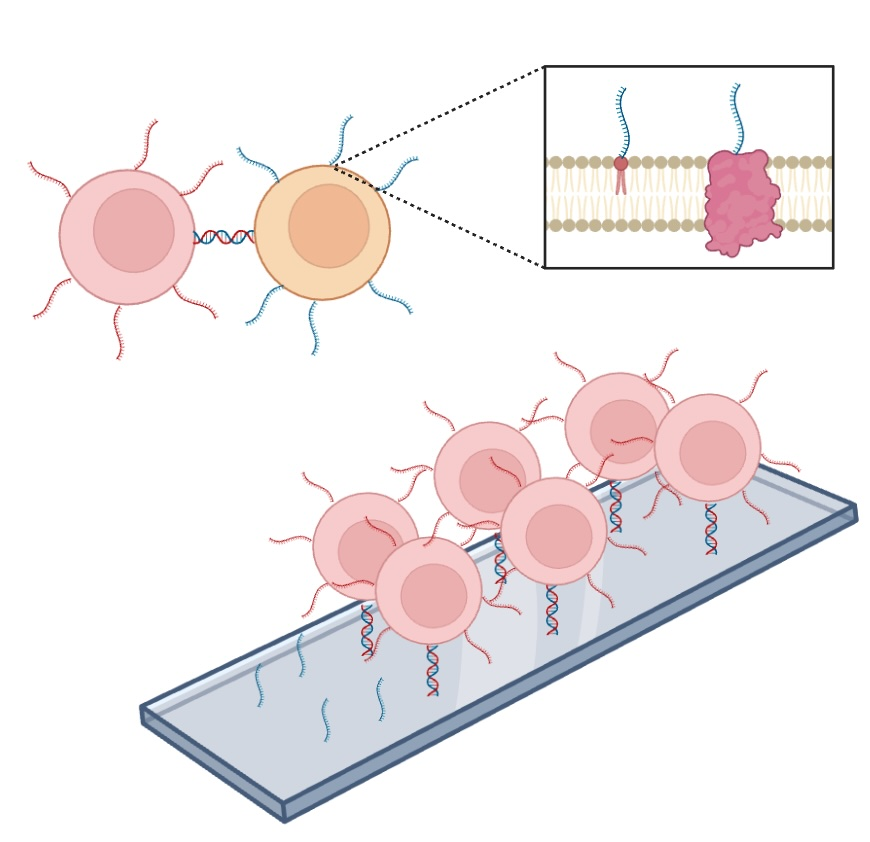
ssDNA incorporated on the cell surface can be used for both cell-cell (above) or cell-material (below) linkages.

DNA programmed assembly of cells (DPAC) involves the use of complementary ssDNA to guide cell interactions. Synthetic ssDNA oligonucleotide sequences are covalently linked to components of the cell membrane, and will hybridize with the complementary ssDNA displayed on a neighboring cell or biomaterial. DPAC is commonly used in directed cell patterning for use in tissue modeling or organoid development, immobilization of cells for analysis, or in bioelectronics.

== Cell modification ==
DNA has been attached to cells through two primary components of the cell surface: the lipid bilayer or surface proteins. For attachment within the lipid bilayer, the oligonucleotide sequence is commonly attached to a phospholipid through a linker such as polyethylene glycol (PEG) to prevent steric hindrance, and the modified lipids will be adopted into the cell membrane. DNA can also be covalently linked to cholesterol in the cell membrane, though these structures have a tendency to aggregate rather than be distributed across the cell membrane. Controlling the length of the DNA strand or generating DNA/cholesterol duplexes to target lipid-rafts can both assist in improved distribution of the DNA-linked cholesterol.

One of the earliest methods of protein labeling was through metabolic hitchhiking. Rather than directly labeling specific proteins, cells are incubated in media with N-azidoacetylmannosamine, which gets metabolized and incorporated into proteins as azido sialic acid, which can react either through Staudinger ligation to phosphine-conjugated ssDNA or by click chemistry to difluorinated cyclooctyne (DIFO)-conjugated ssDNA. Another non-specific method of protein labeling is through reaction with NHS-DNA conjugates, which will covalently link to lysine residues in cell surface proteins. Though more complicated to generate, researchers have designed protein specific DNA-labeled cells, such as with an engineered T cell receptor (TCR). A ssDNA sequence covalently linked to SNAP tag protein can then be conjugated to the transmembrane domain and intracellular CD3ζ chain of the TCR.

== Cell-cell assembly, interactions, and uses ==
One of the many applications of DPAC is programming cell-to-cell interactions. This technology allows the placement of cells in very specific spatial orientations with high fidelity, facilitating behaviors typically only accomplished by the complex, in vivo interactions that come with distinct layout within the extracellular matrix (ECM) and cues from other cell types. The underlying principle of DPAC is the high precision of binding between complementary ssDNA. By conjugating complementary ssDNA to cell membranes, cells can be directed to tightly bind other cells or surfaces in a directed fashion. An early example was to link human embryonic kidney cells to a gold square pad. Later, DPAC was used by Gartner and Bertozzi et al. to force cell-cell adhesion.

Stretches of linear ssDNA, 10-20 nucleotides in length, are most commonly used in DPAC. Other variations used in practice include DNA origami scaffolds, polyvalent DNA molecules that have the capability to bind several complementary sequences, and aptamer logic circuits that change conformation upon binding with an activator strand. DNA origami nanostructures (DONs) have been constructed in many different fashions. Akbari et al. for example, demonstrated in a 2017 study how they could perform cell-cell adhesion between homotypic and heterotypic cells using DONs, which they coined "membrane-bound breadboards" (MBBs). The MBBs they synthesized consisted of several double-stranded DNA sequences (dsDNA) arranged in a rectangular "board-like" shape, with ssDNA sequences extending normal to the top and bottom of the board, serving as binding sites for cells with complementary strands attached. DONs as a means of cell-cell adhesion are more rigid than linear ssDNA sequences, because they cover a larger surface area of the cell membrane and restrict movement around the binding site. DONs provide stronger anchoring points for cell-cell interactions than dsDNA sequences for this reason.

DNA aptamers and DNA hairpin logic circuits are other methods for controlling cell-cell interactions. DNA aptamers are ssDNA sequences that change conformation upon binding with a ligand and can be used to bind receptor proteins on cell surfaces. Because of this, they are a useful tool for directing binding of specific cell types, and cells targeted for binding do not have to be modified with membrane-bound DNA strands. DNA hairpin logic circuits on the other hand, are combinations of ssDNA molecules consisting of a stem of complementary base pairs bound to each other, a loop of unbound DNA base pairs, and a toehold region that is engineered to bind added activator DNA strands and trigger the unfurling or formation of the loop. These conformational changes define an "ON" and "OFF" configuration for the hairpin sequence, and by using sequential allosteric activation, researchers can conjugate multiple hairpin loops to each other allowing for controlled activation of binding sites and different cell assembly conformations.

Other notable manipulations of DPAC include pH and light dependent hybridization, used to time the binding of cells with complementary DNA strands under desired conditions, and DNA hydrogels, defined as 3D environments of hybridized DNA strands mimicking an ECM structure to support cells. Overall, DPAC has proven to be an incredibly useful tool across several areas of research relating to cell-cell interactions. Relevant applications include stem cell research, modulating cell behavior, capturing single cells for analysis, immunology, cancer research, and the creation of 3D microtissues.

== Cell-material assembly ==
DPAC protocols often require several components, including a modular workflow with cell labeling, DNA-patterned templates, a method for controlled assembly, and matrix embedding. 2D DNA-patterned substrates can be used as temporary templates for patterning. In this process, cells can be flowed over, and hybridization captures cells into defined patterns with single-cell precision. Oligonucleotides can be used like 'Velcro' to allow for sequence-specific and reversible cell adhesion to the template with complementary DNA, then be released through DNase treatment for subsequent steps, if needed. Initially, DPAC was conducted over gold substrates and the DNA would bind to gold patterned surface via Au/SH reactions. During such a DPAC setup, the 5' amine ends of the DNA covalently attach to the complementary strand on the aldehyde-functionalized surface. An example of this is an aldehyde-coated glass slide passivated with hydrophobic silane. Amino-modified DNA is patterned onto the slide, and reductive amination leads to covalent bonds between the surface and the DNA. Then a flow cell can be placed above the pattern to allow sequential flow of different cell populations over these surfaces, as well as different reagents. The cells labeled with complementary sequences bind to the DNA patterns on the glass. 3D structures, such as synthetic Polyacrylamide/Poly(ethylene glycol) ( PAAm/PEG) hydrogels, can also be used as templates. Later, when the cells are flowed over and bind to the surface, ECM hydrogels, such as Matrigel and collagen I mixtures, can be flowed over the assembled cell patterns, along with DNase to cleave the cell substrate while the ECM gels. This provides native growth factors and matrix during the DNA-templated assembly phase of the process. Similar processes have been accomplished during ligand-receptor binding and physical grafting techniques to attract cells or other particles together linked DNA strands and have been achieved on the nanometer to millimeter scale.

== Related research ==
DNA-programmed cell assembly builds on and is interconnected with several broader areas of research, including DNA nanotechnology, programmable materials, and synthetic biology. DNA origami is a more specific example of a programmable structural material, in which a long ssDNA scaffold can be contorted into complex 2D and 3D shapes through short complementary staple strands. Several orthogonal DNA pairs interact with each other to create complex structures, usually in the nanometer range. DNA-origami nanoarrays can be used with multivalent aptamers to improve binding affinity to low-affinity antigen-specific cells through adjusting aptamer valency and spacing to match the target proteins' surfaces. Additionally, short oligonucleotide strands called aptamers can bind to proteins with high affinity and specificity, making them useful for targeted protein degradation. DPAC has also been used in the design of microfluidic devices. Chambers with complementary ssDNA strands can immobilize modified cells, allowing for analysis of non-adherent cells with single-cell precision.
