= Jinbo Chen =

Chinese-American biostatistician

Jinbo Chen is a Chinese and American biostatistician and epidemiologist whose research has concerned two-phase (nested) case-control studies, studies of genetic association, statistical risk prediction, and the use of electronic health record data, for health issues including cancer, preterm birth, allergies, and cardiovascular disease. She is a professor of biostatistics in the Department of Biostatistics and Epidemiology at the Perelman School of Medicine of the University of Pennsylvania.

== Education and career ==
Chen has a 1992 bachelor's degree in physics from Beijing Normal University. She studied biostatistics at the University of Washington, where she received a master's degree in 1999 and completed her Ph.D. in 2002. Her dissertation, Semiparametric Efficient and Inefficient Estimation for the Auxiliary Outcome Problem with the Conditional Mean Model, was supervised by Norman Breslow.

At the University of Pennsylvania, Chen is director of the Statistical Center for Translational Research in Medicine, associate director of the Penn Center for Precision Medicine, associate director and lead biostatistician of the Penn Medicine Biobank, and a senior scholar in the Center for Clinical Epidemiology and Biostatistics and in the Institute of Biomedical Informatics.

== Recognition ==
Chen is a Fellow of the American Statistical Association, elected in 2019. In 2024, she was elected as a fellow of the American Association for the Advancement of Science, "for distinguished contributions to breast cancer risk prediction models, gene-environment interactions, and integrating prediction models in electronic health records, and for highly impactful leadership in research and services to the profession of statistics".
