= Beth Ann Griffin =

American statistician

Beth Ann Griffin is an American public health statistician who works as a senior statistician at the RAND Corporation, where she co-directs the RAND/USC Opioid Policy Tools and Information Center. She is an expert on causal inference, and has applied her research on topics including the effects of government policy on drug addiction and gun control, connections between mental health and drug abuse, and environmental influences on Huntington's disease.

== Education and career ==
Griffin studied mathematics at the University of Pennsylvania, where she was a 1999 Dean's Scholar. She completed a Ph.D. in biostatistics at the Harvard T.H. Chan School of Public Health in 2006; her dissertation, Inference for Failure Time Data Subject to Interrupted Hazards to Interval Censoring, was supervised by biostatistician Stephen Lagakos.

At RAND, she was co-director of the Center for Causal Inference from 2013 to 2018, before taking her current role as co-director of the Opioid Policy Tools and Information Center.

== Recognition ==
Griffin was elected as a Fellow of the American Statistical Association in 2022, "for excellence in applied statistics, including improving the state-of-the-art of statistical practice in addiction research and health policy evaluations; for exemplary contributions to teaching and software development; and for service to the profession".
