= Ethel Gilbert =

American biostatistician

Ethel S. Gilbert is an American biostatistician and an expert in the risks of radiation-induced cancer, including cancers in nuclear workers and second cancers in radiation therapy patients.

== Education and career ==
Gilbert is a graduate of Oberlin College, and completed a Ph.D. in biostatistics at the University of Michigan.

She has worked at the Pacific Northwest National Laboratory, the Radiation Effects Research Foundation, and at the National Cancer Institute from 1996 until her 2016 retirement. She also held a faculty position in biostatistics and biomathematics at the University of Washington.

== Recognition ==
Gilbert won the George W. Snedecor Award of the Committee of Presidents of Statistical Societies in 1981 for her work on "the assessment of risks from occupational exposure to ionizing radiation". She became a Fellow of the American Statistical Association in 1988.

She won the NIH MERIT award in 2003, and the National Cancer Institute gave her their Director's Award in 2015. In 2016, the Royal Swedish Academy of Sciences gave Gilbert their Gold Medal for Radiation Protection.
