= Marie Davidian =

American biostatistician

Marie Davidian is an American biostatistician known for her work in longitudinal data analysis and precision medicine. She is the J. Stuart Hunter Distinguished Professor of Statistics at North Carolina State University. She was president of the American Statistical Association for 2013.

== Education and career ==
Davidian was born in Washington, D.C. She did her undergraduate studies at the University of Virginia, initially in mechanical engineering but changing her major to applied mathematics after becoming fascinated by statistics in a class taught by David P. Harrington.

She completed her PhD in 1986 from the University of North Carolina at Chapel Hill, under the supervision of Raymond J. Carroll, with a dissertation on Variance Function Estimation in Heteroscedastic Regression Models.

She joined the North Carolina State faculty in 1987, and also holds an adjunct professorship at Duke University.

== Books ==
Davidian is the author of Nonlinear Models for Repeated Measurement Data (with D. M. Giltinan, CRC Press, 1995) and editor of Longitudinal Data Analysis (with Fitzmaurice, Verbeke, and Molenberghs, CRC Press 2008).

== Awards and honors ==
Davidian is a fellow of the American Statistical Association, the Institute of Mathematical Statistics, and the American Association for the Advancement of Science, and an elected member of the International Statistical Institute.

She is the 2007 winner of the Janet L. Norwood Award for Outstanding Achievement by a Woman in the Statistical Sciences, the 2009 winner of the George W. Snedecor Award "for fundamental contributions to the theory and methodology of longitudinal data, especially nonlinear mixed effects models; for significant contributions to the analysis of clinical trials and observational studies, and for leadership as president of ENAR, as editor, and as a member of the International Biometric Society council", and the 2011 winner of the Florence Nightingale David Award "for important contributions to the development of methods for analyzing data from longitudinal studies and clinical trials, and for outstanding leadership and dedication to the statistical profession".

She was named Hunter Distinguished Professor in 2017, after previously holding the William Neal Reynolds Professorship since 2005.

In 2018 Davidian was recipient of the American Statistical Association's Founders Award.
