= Ruth Pfeiffer =

Biostatistician

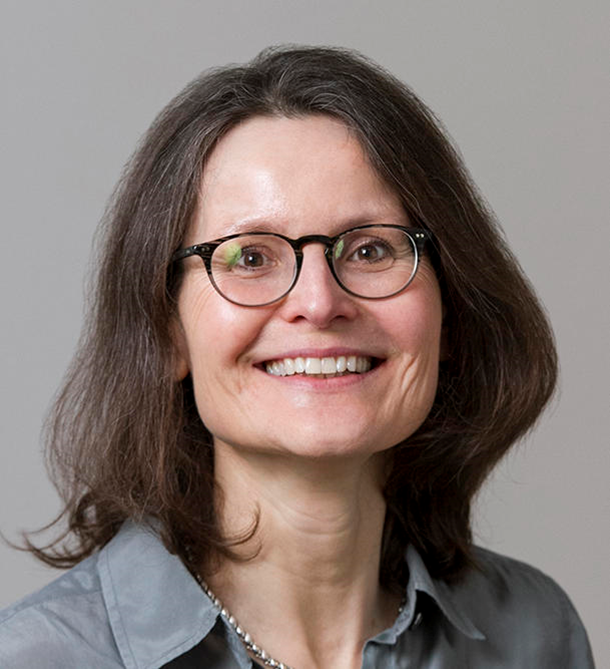
- Born: Ruth Maria Pfeiffer
- Education: TU Wien; University of Maryland, College Park
- Scientific career
- Fields: Biostatistics, cancer epidemiology
- Workplaces: National Cancer Institute
- Thesis: Statistical problems for stochastic processes with hysteresis (1998)
- Doctoral advisor: Mark Freidlin

Ruth Maria Pfeiffer is a biostatistician who researches risk prediction, molecular and genetic epidemiology, and electronic medical records. She is a senior investigator in the biostatistics branch at the National Cancer Institute. Pfeiffer is an elected member of the International Statistical Institute and the American Statistical Association.

== Life ==
Pfeiffer received an M.S. degree in applied mathematics from the TU Wien. She earned a M.A. in applied statistics and a Ph.D. (1998) in mathematical statistics from the University of Maryland, College Park. Her dissertation was titled, Statistical problems for stochastic processes with hysteresis. Mark Freidlin was Pfeiffer's doctoral advisor.

Pfeiffer is a tenured senior investigator in the biostatistics branch of the division of cancer epidemiology and genetics (DCEG), National Cancer Institute (NCI). Her research focuses on statistical methods for risk prediction, problems arising in molecular and genetic epidemiologic studies, and the analysis of data from electronic medical records. Pfeiffer is the recipient of a Fulbright Fellowship and an elected member of the International Statistical Institute. In 2013, she became an elected Fellow of the American Statistical Association.

== Selected works ==
- Pfeiffer, Ruth M.; Gail, Mitchell H. (2017). Absolute Risk: Methods and Applications in Clinical Management and Public Health. CRC Press. ISBN 978-1-4665-6168-7.
