= Snedecor Award =

Statistical award

The Snedecor Award, named after George W. Snedecor, is given by the Committee of Presidents of Statistical Societies to a statistician for contribution to biometry.

== Winners ==
- 1977: A. P. Dawid
- 1978: Bruce W. Turnbull
- 1979: Ethel S. Gilbert
- 1981: Barry H. Margolin
- 1982: Byron J. T. Morgan
- 1983: D. S. Robson
- 1984: Stuart H. Hurlbert
- 1985: Mitchell H. Gail
- 1986: Scott L. Zeger
- 1987: George E. Bonney
- 1988: Cyrus R. Mehta
- 1989: Barry I. Graubard
- 1990: Kenneth H. Pollock
- 1993: Kenneth L. Lange
- 1995: Norman E. Breslow
- 1997: Michael A. Newton
- 1999: Daniel Scharfstein
- 2001: Patrick J. Heagerty
- 2003: Paul R. Rosenbaum
- 2005: Nicholas P. Jewell
- 2007: Donald Rubin
- 2009: Marie Davidian
- 2011: Nilanjan Chatterjee
- 2013: Jack Kalbfleisch
- 2015: Danyu Lin
- 2017: Aurore Delaigle
- 2019: Sudipto Banerjee
- 2021: David Dunson
- 2023: Michael Kosorok
- 2025: Hongtu Zhu

== See also ==
- List of mathematics awards
