= Joel Kleinman =

U.S. statistician and epidemiologist

- Born: Joel C. Kleinman; 1946; Brooklyn, New York, U.S.
- Died: May 2, 1991 (aged 44); Berkeley Springs, West Virginia, U.S.
- Education: City College of New York; Harvard University
- Spouse: Hynda Kleinman
- Children: 2
- Awards: Mortimer Spiegelman Award (1982)
- Scientific career
- Fields: Health statistics, epidemiology
- Workplaces: Harvard University; National Center for Health Statistics

Joel C. Kleinman (1946 – May 2, 1991) was an American health statistician and epidemiologist specializing on the causes of infant mortality. He was director of analysis at the National Center for Health Statistics.

== Life ==
Kleinman was born in 1946 in Brooklyn, New York to Rose and George Kleinman. He was raised in the Bronx. In 1967, he earned a bachelor's degree from City College of New York. He completed a master's degree and Ph.D. in statistics (1971) from Harvard University. He worked there as an assistant professor of biostatistics from 1971 to 1975. In 1975, Kleinman joined the National Center for Health Statistics as a visiting service fellow. He became its director of analysis in 1980. In 1982, Kleinman won the Mortimer Spiegelman Award. In 1990, he was elected a Fellow of the American Statistical Association. A health statistician and epidemiologist, he specialized on the causes of infant mortality.

Kleinman was married to cell biologist Hynda Kleinman. They had two daughters. He died of diabetes complications on May 2, 1991, during a business trip in Berkeley Springs, West Virginia.
