= Jennifer Clark Nelson =

American biostatistician

Jennifer Clark Nelson (née Clark) is an American biostatistician whose research concerns the safety and efficacy of vaccines and drug treatments, and the use and misuse of electronic health records in medical research. She is director of biostatistics at the Kaiser Permanente Washington Health Research Institute, and an affiliate professor of biostatistics at the University of Washington.

== Education and career ==
Nelson studied mathematics and accounting at Luther College (Iowa), graduating summa cum laude in 1994 as an Academic All-America volleyball player. She went to the University of Washington for continued studies in biostatistics, received a master's degree there in 1996, and completed her Ph.D. in 1999. Her dissertation, A Graphical Methodology for Describing Interrater Variability in Ordinal Assessment among Many Raters, was supervised by Margaret Sullivan Pepe.

After continuing as a research scientist at the University of Washington from 1999 to 2003, she joined the Kaiser Permanente Washington Health Research Institute (KPWHRI) in 2003. She added an affiliate position on the University of Washington faculty in 2004, and became director of biostatistics at KPWHRI in 2014.

== Recognition ==
Nelson was a 2009 recipient of the Vaccine Safety Datalink Margarette Kolczak Award for her contributions to vaccine safety, and a 2019 recipient of Luther College's Distinguished Service Award. She was elected as a Fellow of the American Statistical Association in 2020.

Her paper with a team of researchers led by Nicola P. Klein, "Surveillance for adverse events after COVID-19 mRNA vaccination" (JAMA, 2021) was named as the Scientific Manuscript of the Year for 2022 by the Health Care Systems Research Network.
