= Myogel =

Myogel is a trade name for a human-based extracellular matrix used in cancer research to provide a 3D cell culture environment for cancer cells. Unlike other synthesized matrices such as matrigel which originated from mice sarcoma, myogel is extracted from a human benign tumor tissue called leiomyoma. Myogel was developed in Tuula Salo's lab at the University of Oulu. The idea started in 2009 by culturing cancer cells on myoma discs. Later in 2015, these myoma tissues were processed following matrigel receipt, to extract a gel form called Myogel. Myogel was compared with matrigel and found to be superior in term of enhancing cancer cells proliferation, migration and invasion.
