= Alice S. Whittemore =

American epidemiologist (1936–2025)

Alice Whittemore
- Born: July 5, 1936
- Died: December 2, 2025 (aged 89); Palm Desert, California
- Education: CUNY Graduate Center (Ph.D.); Hunter College (M.A.); Marymount Manhattan (B.S.)
- Awards: AAAS fellow (1992); Janet L. Norwood Award (2004); Florence Nightingale David Award (2005); ASA Nathan Mantel Lifetime Achievement Award (2010); R. A. Fisher Lectureship (2016)
- Scientific career
- Fields: Biostatistics, group theory
- Workplaces: Stanford University; New York University; Hunter College
- Thesis: The Frattini Subgroup (1967)
- Doctoral advisor: Gilbert Baumslag

Alice Segers Whittemore (July 5, 1936 – December 2, 2025) was an American epidemiologist and biostatistician who studied the effects of genetics and lifestyle on cancer, following an earlier career as a pure mathematician studying group theory. She worked as a professor of health research and policy and of biomedical data science at Stanford University, and served as president of the International Biometric Society.

== Education and career ==
Whittemore was born on July 5, 1936.

She originally studied pure mathematics. She obtained a bachelor's degree in 1958 from Marymount Manhattan College, and a master's degree in 1964 from Hunter College. Whittemore completed a Ph.D. in 1967, from the Graduate Center of the City University of New York with a dissertation on Frattini subgroups supervised by Gilbert Baumslag.

As a professor of mathematics at Hunter College, she became interested in epidemiology and statistics. While teaching in Hunter College's new statistics program, she reportedly taught herself statistics by reading the textbook just a few pages ahead of her students, completing all the exercises herself before assigning them to the class. She pursued a fellowship to New York University to accomplish that shift of interests, under the mentorship of Joseph Keller. Keller and Whittemore married and moved together to Stanford in 1978. There Whittemore became a professor in the Department of Health Research and Policy. She was chief of epidemiology there from 1997 to 2001, and later became co-chair of the department. Keller died in 2016.

Whittemore died on December 2, 2025 in her home in Palm Desert, California, at the age of 89.

== Contributions ==
One of Whittemore's studies found a link between fertility drugs and ovarian cancer, especially strong among women who were treated with the drugs but failed to conceive.

Later, Whittemore contributed her expertise in a paper published in the American Journal of Epidemiology to investigating racial and ethnic differences in ovarian cancer risk.

== Awards and honors ==
In 1992, Whittemore was elected as a fellow of the American Association for the Advancement of Science. She was also a fellow of the American Statistical Association, and a member of the National Academy of Medicine.

In 2004, she won the Janet L. Norwood Award for outstanding achievement by a woman in the statistical sciences. In 2010, the Statistics in Epidemiology section of the American Statistical Association gave her their Nathan Mantel Lifetime Achievement Award. She was the recipient of the Committee of Presidents of Statistical Societies' Florence Nightingale David Award in 2005 and R. A. Fisher Lectureship in 2016 "for her fundamental contributions to biostatistics and epidemiology, covering a wide range of topics from environmental risk assessment to genetic linkage analysis, genetic association studies and cancer epidemiology; for bringing her statistical and mathematical insight to bear on the collection and interpretation of scientific data; for her leadership in large consortia of cancer studies; and for being a role model for many young scientists".

Whittemore also took part in the assessment of the risk prediction models of the disease.

== Selected publications ==
- Whittemore, Alice S. (2009), "Evaluating Health Risk Models", arXiv:0906.2691 [stat.ME]
- Whittemore, A. S.; Korn, E. L. (July 1980), "Asthma and air pollution in the Los Angeles area.", American Journal of Public Health, 70 (7): 687–696, doi:10.2105/ajph.70.7.687, PMC 1619475, PMID 7386702
- Whittemore, A. S.; Wu-Williams, A. H.; Lee, M.; Shu, Z.; Gallagher, R. P.; Deng-ao, J.; Lun, Z.; Xianghui, W.; Kun, C.; Jung, D.; Teh, C.-Z.; Chengde, L.; Yao, X. J.; Paffenbarger, R. S.; Henderson, B. E. (June 1990), "Diet, Physical Activity, and Colorectal Cancer Among Chinese in North America and China", JNCI Journal of the National Cancer Institute, 82 (11): 915–926, doi:10.1093/jnci/82.11.915, PMID 2342126.
- Whittemore, Alice S.; Halpern, Jerry (March 1994), "A Class of Tests for Linkage Using Affected Pedigree Members", Biometrics, 50 (1): 118–27, doi:10.2307/2533202, JSTOR 2533202, PMID 8086596.
- Whittemore, A. S.; Kolonel, L. N.; Wu, A. H.; John, E. M.; Gallagher, R. P.; Howe, G. R.; Burch, J. D.; Hankin, J.; Dreon, D. M.; West, D. W.; Teh, C.-Z.; Paffenbarger, R. S. (May 1995), "Prostate Cancer in Relation to Diet, Physical Activity, and Body Size in Blacks, Whites, and Asians in the United States and Canada", JNCI Journal of the National Cancer Institute, 87 (9): 652–661, doi:10.1093/jnci/87.9.652, PMID 7752270.
- Whittemore, A. S.; Gong, G.; Itnyre, J. (March 1997), "Prevalence and contribution of BRCA1 mutations in breast cancer and ovarian cancer: results from three U.S. population-based case-control studies of ovarian cancer", The American Journal of Human Genetics, 60 (3): 496–504, PMC 1712497, PMID 9042908.
- Manolio, Teri A.; Collins, Francis S.; Cox, Nancy J.; Goldstein, David B.; Hindorff, Lucia A.; Hunter, David J.; McCarthy, Mark I.; Ramos, Erin M.; Cardon, Lon R.; Chakravarti, Aravinda; Cho, Judy H.; Guttmacher, Alan E.; Kong, Augustine; Kruglyak, Leonid; Mardis, Elaine; Rotimi, Charles N.; Slatkin, Montgomery; Valle, David; Whittemore, Alice S.; Boehnke, Michael; Clark, Andrew G.; Eichler, Evan E.; Gibson, Greg; Haines, Jonathan L.; Mackay, Trudy F. C.; McCarroll, Steven A.; Visscher, Peter M. (October 2009), "Finding the missing heritability of complex diseases", Nature, 461 (7265): 747–753, Bibcode:2009Natur.461..747M, doi:10.1038/nature08494, PMC 2831613, PMID 19812666.
