= Mortimer Spiegelman =

American statistician

- Born: December 10, 1901; Brooklyn, New York
- Died: March 25, 1969 (aged 67)
- Education: Polytechnic Institute of Brooklyn; Harvard University
- Scientific career
- Fields: Demography; Public health Statistics
- Institutions: American Public Health Association
- Academic advisors: Louis I. Dublin; Alfred J. Lotka

Mortimer Spiegelman (December 10, 1901 – March 25, 1969) was an American statistician, actuary, and demographer whose research focused on the application of statistics to the field of public health. He was Staff Statistician at the American Public Health Association (APHA) from 1967 until his death in 1969. He was a fellow of the APHA, the Society of Actuaries, and the American Statistical Association. The APHA's Statistics Section has awarded the Mortimer Spiegelman Award in his honor since 1970. The annual award is given to a distinguished public health statistician under the age of 40.
