= Margaret Sullivan Pepe =

Irish biostatistician

- Born: Margaret Patricia O'Sullivan; June 24, 1961 (age 65); Cork, Ireland
- Education: University College Cork; University of Washington School of Public Health
- Awards: Mortimer Spiegelman Award (1997)
- Scientific career
- Fields: Biostatistics
- Workplaces: University of Washington School of Public Health; Fred Hutchinson Cancer Research Center
- Doctoral advisor: Thomas R. Fleming
- Doctoral students: Lori E. Dodd; Jennifer Clark Nelson

Margaret Patricia O'Sullivan Pepe (born June 24, 1961) is an Irish biostatistician specializing in the evaluation of tests and biomarkers for disease screening. She is a professor of biostatistics at the University of Washington School of Public Health and a researcher at the Fred Hutchinson Cancer Research Center.

== Life ==
Pepe was born June 24, 1961, in Cork, Ireland to Seamus O'Sullivan. She attended Mount Mercy College, Cork. She completed a B.Sc. in mathematics science at the University College Cork in 1981. Pepe earned a M.S. in statistics in 1984 and a Ph.D. in biostatistics at the University of Washington School of Public Health in 1986. Her dissertation was titled, A new class of statistics for the two-sample survival analysis problem. Thomas R. Fleming was her doctoral advisor.

In 1997, she won the Mortimer Spiegelman Award.

Pepe is a professor of biostatistics at the University of Washington School of Public Health. She is a researcher at the Fred Hutchinson Cancer Research Center.

== Works ==
- Pepe, Margaret Sullivan (2005). The Statistical Evaluation of Medical Tests for Classification and Prediction. Oxford University Press. ISBN 978-0-19-850984-4.
- Pepe, M. (1997-09-01). "A regression modelling framework for receiver operating characteristic curves in medical diagnostic testing". Biometrika. 84 (3): 595–608. doi:10.1093/biomet/84.3.595. ISSN 0006-3444.
- Gu, W.; Pepe, M. S. (2008-05-23). "Estimating the capacity for improvement in risk prediction with a marker". Biostatistics. 10 (1): 172–186. doi:10.1093/biostatistics/kxn025. ISSN 1465-4644. PMC 2639345. PMID 18714084.
