= Cultrex BME =

Cultrex Basement Membrane Extract (BME) is the trade name for a extracellular protein mixture secreted by Engelbreth-Holm-Swarm (EHS) mouse sarcoma cells and manufactured into a hydrogel by R&D Systems, a brand of Bio-Techne. Similar to Matrigel, this hydrogel is a natural extracellular matrix that mimics the complex extracellular environment within complex tissues. It is used as a general cell culture substrate across a wide variety of research applications.

== Composition ==
The major components of Cultrex BME include laminin, collagen, entactin/nidogen, and heparin sulfate proteoglycans. These components are found in the basement membrane extracellular matrix that forms an interface between stromal tissue and adjacent endothelial, epithelial, muscle, or neuronal cells. Also present in Cultrex BME are growth factors, however these can be reduced during production of the hydrogel. Reduced growth factor (RGF) Cultrex BME is commonly used for the culture of pluripotent stem cells and organoids.

== Cell culture ==
Cultrex BME is gelatinous at 4 °C. The matrix proteins polymerize and solidify at temperatures above 18 °C. Ice-cold basement membrane extract can be dispensed directly onto plastic cell culture labware or it can be diluted in ice-cold phosphate buffered saline or cell culture media prior to dispensing.

Due to its heterogenous extracellular matrix protein composition, cells cultured using basement membrane extract show complex cellular behaviors that are difficult to reproduce under laboratory conditions. These include cell adhesion, migration, invasion, proliferation, differentiation, and endothelial cell tube formation. EHS tumor-derived matrices, such as Cultrex BME, are used for a variety of cell culture applications, including angiogenesis, spheroid formation, organoid culture, pluripotent stem cell culture, xenograft, and in vivo and in vitro tumor modeling

== Pluripotent stem cells ==
Cultrex BME is used as an attachment substrate to promote the expansion and maintenance of induced pluripotent stem cells and embryonic stem cells in the absence of feeder cells. The extracellular matrix proteins that compose the basement membrane extract are needed to maintain stem cells in an undifferentiated state during prolonged cell culture. For expanding stem cells, the hydrogel is commonly diluted prior to coating cell culture plasticware. Concentrated Cultrex BME is often used during cell differentiation or transitioning pluripotent stem cells into organoid or spheroid culture.

== Organoid and 3D cell culture ==
Proliferation and differentiation of spheroids and organoids, derived from induced pluripotent stem cells or adult tissue-specific stem cells, is supported by EHS-derived hydrogels such as Cultrex BME. EHS-derived hydrogels have been used to generate a variety of organoids, including intestinal, lung, liver, and snake venom gland

[SS1]
