= J. Richard Landis =

American biostatistician

- Education: Millersville University; University of North Carolina at Chapel Hill
- Awards: Mortimer Spiegelman Gold Medal Award from the American Public Health Association (1984)
- Scientific career
- Fields: Biostatistics
- Institutions: University of Michigan School of Public Health; Pennsylvania State University; University of Pennsylvania
- Thesis: A General Methodology for the Measurement of Observer Agreement when the Data Are Categorical (1975)
- Doctoral advisor: Gary Grove Koch

J. Richard Landis is an American biostatistician and emeritus Professor of Biostatistics in the Perelman School of Medicine at the University of Pennsylvania, where he is also the senior vice chair of the Department of Biostatistics, Epidemiology and Informatics, director of the Biostatistics Unit within the Center for Clinical Epidemiology and Biostatistics, and faculty Director of the Clinical Research Computing Unit.

== Education and academic career ==
Landis received his bachelor's degree from Millersville University in 1969 and his M.S. and Ph.D. from the University of North Carolina at Chapel Hill in 1973 and 1975, respectively. He was a faculty member at the University of Michigan School of Public Health from 1975 to 1988, where his positions included Professor of Biostatistics. In 1988, he joined the faculty of Pennsylvania State University as the founder of the Center for Biostatistics and Epidemiology (CBE) at the Milton S. Hershey Medical Center. He served as the director of the CBE for nine years until joining the faculty of the University of Pennsylvania in 1997.

== Honors and awards ==
Landis received the Mortimer Spiegelman Award from the American Public Health Association in 1984. He was elected a member of the International Statistical Institute in 1985 and a fellow of the American Statistical Association in 1987. In 2011, he received the Marvin Zelen Leadership Award in Statistical Science from the Harvard School of Public Health.
