= Hynda Kleinman =

American cell biologist

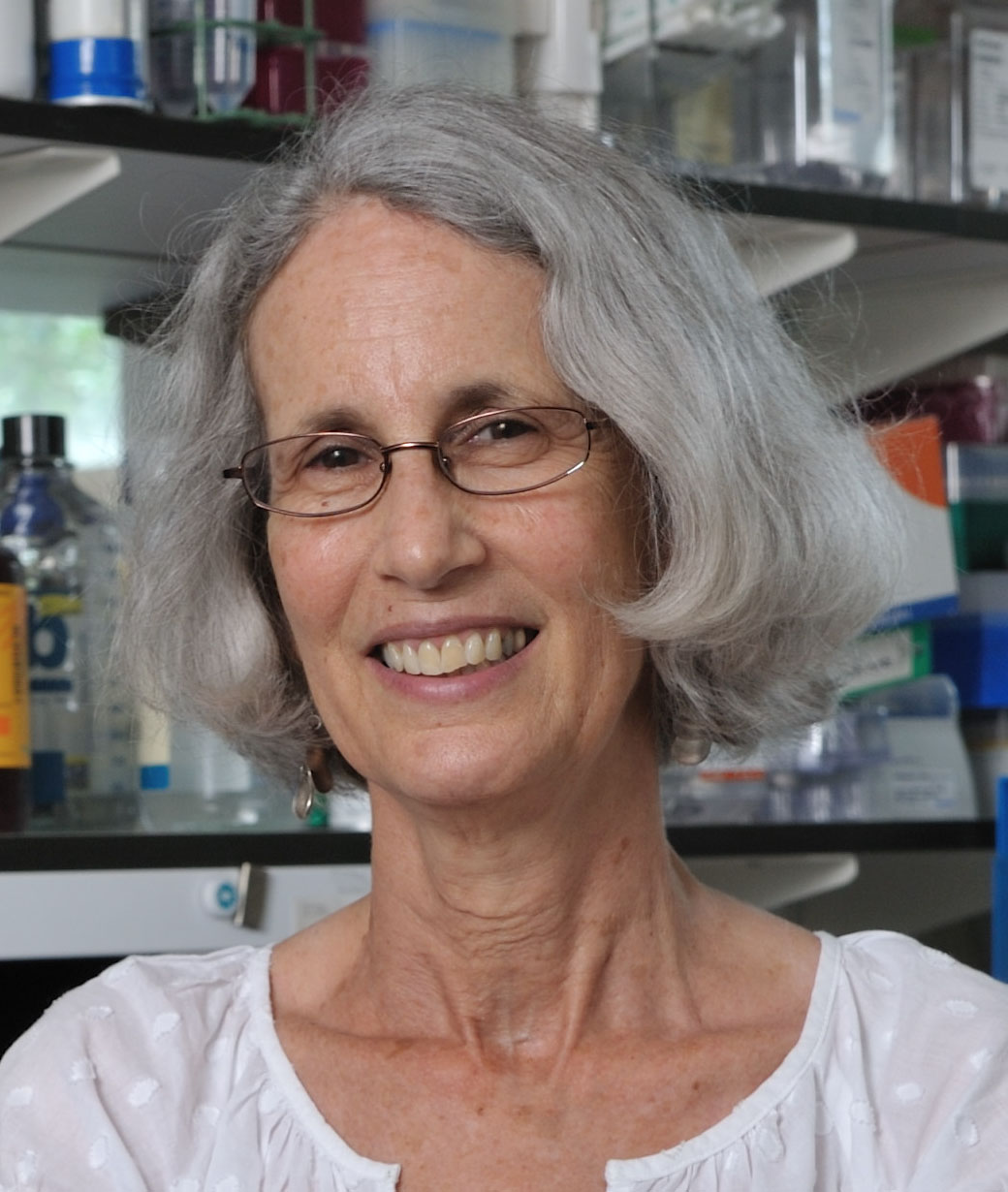
- Kleinman in 2012
- Education: Simmons College; Massachusetts Institute of Technology
- Known for: Matrigel
- Spouse: Joel Kleinman deceased in 1991 Nolan K. Danchik 1995-present
- Children: 2 with Joel C. Kleinman, 2 by marriage with Nolan K. Danchik
- Scientific career
- Fields: Cell biology
- Workplaces: National Institute of Dental and Craniofacial Research; George Washington University

Hynda K. Kleinman is an American cell biologist who was the chief of the cell biology section at the National Institute of Dental and Craniofacial Research from 1985 to 2006. She co-invented Matrigel.

== Early life ==
Kleinman was born into a family that valued nature, often gardening, fishing, and hiking. Kleinman's father was a trained geologist and would collect rocks and arrowheads on hikes, which sparked Kleinman's interest in chemical and biological sciences.

== Life ==
Kleinman received a B.S. in chemistry from Simmons College in 1969 and a M.S. and Ph.D. from the Massachusetts Institute of Technology in 1973. She did postdoctoral training at Tufts University.

Kleinman worked at National Institutes of Health (NIH) from 1975 to 2006 in the National Institute of Dental and Craniofacial Research (NIDCR) and served as Chief of the Cell Biology Section in NIDCR's Laboratory of Cell and Developmental Biology (1985–2006). Her laboratory was the first to report the wound-healing effects of thymosin beta 4 (TB4), a synthetic version of a naturally occurring molecule. Her research accomplishments also include defining various angiogenic and antiangiogenic molecules and identifying sites on laminin for adhesion, migration, neurite outgrowth, angiogenesis, metastases and inhibition of metastases, and the respective receptors. Kleinman is a co-inventor of Matrigel. In 1992, during his first week as deputy director for intramural research, Lance Liotta appointed Kleinman to chair the new intramural women scientists' task force to investigate impediments to the advancement of women at NIH.

She has received numerous awards for her research and for her efforts on behalf of women scientists. She has obtained multiple patents, many of which have been commercialized and one of which is in pivotal clinical trials.

In 2006, she left the NIH to join the George Washington University as an adjunct professor in the department of biochemistry and molecular biology. She has subsequently consulted for various pharmaceutical companies

Kleinman is Jewish. She was married to health statistician Joel C. Kleinman in 1968-1991 when he died. They had two daughters. She is married to computer engineer Nolan K. Danchik 1995-present.
