= Debbie Cheng =

American biostatistician

Debbie Mein-Pay Cheng is an American biostatistician and a professor at the Boston University School of Public Health. She researches applied statistics and clinical trial design. Cheng was elected a fellow of the American Statistical Association in 2023. She earned a B.S. in industrial engineering from Northwestern University. She received a Sc.D. in biostatistics from the Harvard T.H. Chan School of Public Health. Her 1999 dissertation was titled, Analysis of Data from Eradication Studies of Chronic Viral Infections. Stephen Lagakos was her doctoral advisor.
