= Zelen's design =

Experimental design for clinical trials

Zelen's design is an experimental design for randomized clinical trials proposed by Harvard School of Public Health statistician Marvin Zelen (1927-2014). In this design, patients are randomized to either the treatment or control group before giving informed consent. Because the group to which a given patient is assigned is known, consent can be sought conditionally.

== Overview ==
In this design, those patients receiving standard care need not be consented for participation in the study other than possibly for privacy issues. On the other hand, those patients randomized to the experimental group are consented as usual, except that they are consenting to the certainty of receiving the experimental treatment only; alternatively these patients can decline and receive the standard treatment instead.

In comparison, the current predominant design is for consent to be solicited prior to randomization. That is, eligible patients are asked if they would agree to participate in the clinical trial as a whole. This entails agreeing to receiving the experimental treatment as a possibility, receiving the control treatment as a possibility, and the uncertainty involved in not knowing.

== Statistical and epidemiological issues ==
There are a number of advantages conferred by the post-randomization consent design.

- Clinicians are more comfortable with this design because each time consent is only sought for one treatment without the uncertainty of randomization.
- Patients correspondingly are not subjected to the uncomfortable feeling that they may or may not be receiving the experimental treatment. This means effects such as resentful demoralization will not become an issue. Analogously, since patients allocated to the standard care group are not necessarily aware of the existence of an alternative treatment, Hawthorne effect is also less of an issue.

Some disadvantages include:

- Contamination by crossing over may be more likely since patients assigned to the treatment group are fully aware of their assignment. Notably, statistical analysis should be performed with intention-to-treat.
- Lack of allocation concealment, which may produce further bias.
- Ethical drawbacks. Palmer (2002) notes, "in the few trials where [Zelen randomization] was employed it has been met with disapproval from participants and others, being deemed inappropriately deceptive and manipulative, at least in trials for serious or life-threatening conditions."

== See also ==
- Cluster randomised controlled trial
- Marvin Zelen (biostatistician)
- Randomized controlled trial
- Statistics
