= Gary Grove Koch =

American biostatistician

- Born: January 6, 1942 (age 83); Mt. Vernon, Ohio
- Education: Ohio State University; University of North Carolina at Chapel Hill
- Scientific career
- Fields: Biostatistics
- Institutions: University of North Carolina at Chapel Hill
- Thesis: The Design of Combinatorial Information Retrieval Systems for Files with Multiple-Valued Attributions (1968)
- Doctoral advisor: Raj Chandra Bose
- Doctoral students: J. Richard Landis; Judith T. Lessler

Gary Grove Koch (born January 6, 1942) is an American biostatistician who serves as professor of biostatistics and director of the Biometric Consulting Laboratory at the University of North Carolina at Chapel Hill, where he has been a faculty member since 1968. In 1972, he was elected a fellow of the American Statistical Association, and in 1974, he received the Mortimer Spiegelman Award from the American Public Health Association. In 1996, he was awarded an honorary doctorate from DeMontfort University in the United Kingdom.
