= David Dunson =

American statistician

David Brian Dunson (born c. 1972) is an American statistician who is Arts and Sciences Distinguished Professor of Statistical Science, Mathematics and Electrical & Computer Engineering at Duke University. His research focuses on developing statistical methods for complex and high-dimensional data. Particular themes of his work include the use of Bayesian hierarchical models, methods for learning latent structure in complex data, and the development of computationally efficient algorithms for uncertainty quantification. He is currently serving as joint Editor of the Journal of the Royal Statistical Society, Series B.

Dunson earned a bachelor's degree in mathematics from Pennsylvania State University in 1994, and completed his Ph.D. in biostatistics in 1997 from Emory University under the supervision of Betz Halloran. He was employed at the National Institute of Environmental Health Sciences from 1997 to 2008, joined the Duke faculty as an adjunct associate professor in 2000, and became a full-time Duke professor in 2008. He also held an adjunct faculty position at the University of North Carolina at Chapel Hill from 2001 to 2013.

Dunson became a Fellow of the American Statistical Association in 2007, the same year in which he won the Mortimer Spiegelman Award given annually to a young researcher in health statistics. He became a Fellow of the Institute of Mathematical Statistics in 2010, and in the same year won the COPSS Presidents' Award. He was named Arts & Sciences Distinguished Professor in 2013. In 2021, Dunson was awarded the George W. Snedecor Award by the Committee of Presidents of Statistical Societies.

== Selected works ==
- Dunson, D. B. (2000). "Bayesian latent variable models for clustered mixed outcomes". Journal of the Royal Statistical Society, Series B (Statistical Methodology). 62 (2): 355–366. doi:10.1111/1467-9868.00236. S2CID 123022782.
- Dunson, D. B.; Colombo, B.; Baird, D. D. (2002). "Changes with age in the level and duration of fertility in the menstrual cycle". Human Reproduction. 17 (5): 1399–1403. doi:10.1093/humrep/17.5.1399. PMID 11980771.
- Chen, Zhen; Dunson, David B. (2003). "Random Effects Selection in Linear Mixed Models". Biometrics. 59 (4): 762–769. doi:10.1111/j.0006-341X.2003.00089.x. PMID 14969453. S2CID 32084657.
- Day Baird, Donna; Dunson, David B.; Hill, Michael C.; Cousins, Deborah; Schectman, Joel M. (2003). "High cumulative incidence of uterine leiomyoma in black and white women: Ultrasound evidence". American Journal of Obstetrics and Gynecology. 188 (1): 100–107. doi:10.1067/mob.2003.99. PMID 12548202.
- Ji, S.; Dunson, D.; Carin, L. (2009). "Multitask Compressive Sensing". IEEE Transactions on Signal Processing. 57 (1): 92–106. Bibcode:2009ITSP...57...92J. doi:10.1109/TSP.2008.2005866. S2CID 15383229.
- Dunson, David B.; Pillai, Natesh; Park, Ju-Hyun (2007). "Bayesian density regression". Journal of the Royal Statistical Society, Series B (Statistical Methodology). 69 (2): 163–183. doi:10.1111/j.1467-9868.2007.00582.x. S2CID 8896547.
- Rodríguez, Abel; Dunson, David B.; Gelfand, Alan E. (2008). "The Nested Dirichlet Process". Journal of the American Statistical Association. 103 (483): 1131–1154. doi:10.1198/016214508000000553. S2CID 13462201.
- Gelman, Andrew; Carlin, John B.; Stern, Hal S.; Dunson, David B.; Vehtari, Aki; Rubin, Donald B. (2013). Bayesian Data Analysis, Third Edition. New York, New York: Chapman and Hall. doi:10.1201/b16018. ISBN 9781439898208.
