= Robert H. Shumway =

American statistician (1936–2025)

- Born: January 21, 1936; Northfield, Minnesota, US
- Died: May 13, 2025 (aged 89)
- Education: Carleton College; George Washington University
- Scientific career
- Fields: time series analysis
- Institutions: Teledyne Technologies; George Washington University; University of California, Davis
- Doctoral advisor: Solomon Kullback
- Doctoral students: Stephen Lagakos; David S. Stoffer

Robert Herman Shumway (January 21, 1936 – May 13, 2025) was an American statistician known for his contribution to time series analysis.

== Education and career ==
Shumway was born in Northfield, Minnesota. He attended Carleton College, where he received a BA in mathematics in 1958. He went on to study statistics at Iowa State University, where he obtained an M.S. in 1960. He worked briefly for the U.S. Navy and was assigned for the analysis of atomic bomb test debris. He continued his graduate study at the George Washington University while working for Teledyne Technologies and obtained his PhD in mathematical statistics in 1965 under the supervision of Solomon Kullback. Shumway remained at George Washington University as an assistant professor just after graduation and was promoted to associate professor. He later joined University of California, Davis in 1980 as one of the early faculty members in the Department of Statistics, where he proceeded to become professor of statistics.

== Honors and awards ==
Shumway won the 1986 American Statistical Association Award for Outstanding Statistical Application. Shumway was a fellow of the American Statistical Association since 1988. He was also an elected member of the International Statistical Institute.

== Bibliography ==
- Shumway, R.H. (1982), "Discriminant analysis for time series", Handbook of Statistics, vol. 2, Elsevier, pp. 1–46, doi:10.1016/s0169-7161(82)02004-5, ISBN 978-0-444-86217-4
- Shumway, R.H. (1983), "Replicated time-series regression: An approach to signal estimation and detection", Handbook of Statistics, vol. 3, Elsevier, pp. 383–408, doi:10.1016/s0169-7161(83)03020-5, ISBN 978-0-444-86726-1
- Shumway, Robert H. (1988). Applied statistical time series analysis. Prentice-Hall series in statistics. Englewood Cliffs, NJ: Prentice-Hall. ISBN 978-0-13-041500-4.
- Der, Zoltan A.; Shumway, Robert H.; Herrin, Eugene T., eds. (2002). Monitoring the Comprehensive Nuclear-Test-Ban Treaty: Data Processing and Infrasound. Basel: Birkhäuser Basel. doi:10.1007/978-3-0348-8144-9. ISBN 978-3-7643-6676-6.
- Shumway, Robert H.; Stoffer, David S. (2019). Time series: a data analysis approach using R. Boca Raton: CRC Press, Taylor & Francis Group. ISBN 978-0-367-22109-6.
- Shumway, Robert H.; Stoffer, David S. (2025). Time Series Analysis and Its Applications: With R Examples. Springer Texts in Statistics (5th ed.). Cham: Springer Nature Switzerland. doi:10.1007/978-3-031-70584-7. ISBN 978-3-031-70583-0.
