= Francesca Dominici =

Italian statistician

Francesca Dominici is a professor of biostatistics at Harvard University. She develops methodology in causal inference and data science and leads research projects that combine big data with health policy and climate change. She is the director of the Harvard Data Science Initiative, and a former senior associate dean for research in the Harvard T.H. Chan School of Public Health.

== Education and career ==
Dominici earned her bachelor's degree in statistics from Sapienza University of Rome in 1993, and a Ph.D. in statistics from the University of Padua in 1997. She was a professor of biostatistics at the Johns Hopkins Bloomberg School of Public Health from 1997 to 2009, with a joint appointment in epidemiology. On moving to Harvard in 2009, she was also given an honorary Master of Public Health degree from Harvard, following the tradition that Harvard faculty must have Harvard degrees.

== Contributions ==
External videos
- “How air pollution impacts our brains”, Francesca Dominici and other speakers, Harvard T.H. Chan School of Public Health, Feb 27, 2024.

Dominici has been active on many study committees on public health, organized by the National Academy of Sciences, National Institutes of Health, and others. Her work in data science has informed revisions of the U.S. National Ambient Air Quality Standards policy in February 7, 2024.

As well, she has taken an active role in the status of university women. Her work on the Johns Hopkins University Committee on the Status of Women earned her the campus Diversity Recognition Award in 2009; at the Chan School of Public Health, she has led the Committee for the Advancement of Women Faculty since 2012.

== Recognition ==
In 2024, Dominici was named to TIME100's inaugural Health list. TIME100 Health recognized her for her groundbreaking contributions to global health.

Dominici became a fellow of the American Statistical Association in 2005. She is also a Fellow of the Institute of Mathematical Statistics, and was elected to the National Academy of Medicine in 2018.

In 2006, she won the Mortimer Spiegelman Award of the American Public Health Association. She is the 2015 winner of the Florence Nightingale David Award of the Committee of Presidents of Statistical Societies, and the 2016 winner of the University of Alabama at Birmingham's Janet L. Norwood Award for Outstanding Achievement in Statistical Sciences, which honors a woman statistician for achievement. In 2020, she won the National Institute of Statistical Sciences (NISS) Jerome Sacks Award for Outstanding Cross-Disciplinary Research.
