= Judith T. Lessler =

American statistician

Judith T. Lessler is an American statistician and expert on survey methodology, particularly on surveys relating to health and epidemiology.

Lessler was born in Charlotte, North Carolina, and grew up on a farm in Iredell County, North Carolina. She earned her Ph.D. in 1974 at the University of North Carolina at Chapel Hill. Her dissertation, A Double Sampling Scheme Model for Eliminating Measurement Process Bias and Estimating Measurement Errors in Surveys, was jointly supervised by Daniel G. Horvitz and Gary Grove Koch.

She worked as a statistician for RTI International, the Battelle Memorial Institute, and National Center for Health Statistics, before retiring to operate a consulting business and run an organic farm on the Alston-DeGraffenried Plantation historic site in Chatham County, North Carolina.

With William D. Kalsbeek, Lessler is the author of Nonsampling Error in Surveys (Wiley, 1992). She was elected as a Fellow of the American Statistical Association in 1992. She is also a Fellow of the American Association for the Advancement of Science.
