= Nick Day (statistician) =

British statistician and epidemiologist

Nicholas Edward Day, CBE, FRS (born 24 September 1939) is a retired statistician and cancer epidemiologist.

== Education ==
He was educated at Gresham's School and the University of Oxford, from 1958-1962, where he gained a B.A. in Mathematics and a Diploma in Statistics, and the University of Aberdeen from 1962-1966, where he obtained a Doctorate of Philosophy.

== Career ==
Day worked at the International Agency for Research on Cancer in Lyon from 1969 to 1986, where he rose to become head of the Unit of Biostatistics and Field Studies. He was director of the Medical Research Council Biostatistics Unit from 1986 to 1989, and continued as honorary director until 1999. From 1997 until his retirement in 2004 he was co-director of the Strangeways Research Laboratory in Cambridge. He was also professor of public health at the University of Cambridge from 1989 to 1999, and professor of epidemiology from 1999 until 2004.

Day was made a Commander of the Order of the British Empire in the 2001 New Year Honours for services to statistics and epidemiology underpinning cancer biology.

His hobbies include sea fishing and tree growing.

== Books ==
- 1980 (with Norman Breslow), Statistical Methods in Cancer Research: Volume 1—The Analysis of Case-Control Studies. International Agency for Research on Cancer, Lyon, France. ISBN 978-92-832-0182-3.
- 1986 (with Matti Hakama & Anthony B. Miller) Screening for cancer of the uterine cervix. International Agency for Research on Cancer, Lyon, France. ISBN 978-92-832-1176-1
- 1987 (with Norman Breslow), Statistical Methods in Cancer Research: Volume 2—The Design and Analysis of Cohort Studies. International Agency for Research on Cancer, Lyon, France. ISBN 978-92-832-1182-2.
- 1988 (edited with Anthony B. Miller) Screening for Breast Cancer. Huber. ISBN 978-0-920887-26-4.
