= Colin Begg (statistician) =

Scottish biostatistician

Colin B. Begg
- Education: University of Glasgow
- Scientific career
- Fields: Biostatistics, epidemiology
- Workplaces: Memorial Sloan-Kettering Cancer Center
- Thesis: Statistical diagnosis (1976)
- Doctoral advisor: John Aitchison

Colin B. Begg is a Scottish biostatistician and epidemiologist. He is an attending biostatistician at the Memorial Sloan-Kettering Cancer Center in New York City. He serves as editor-in-chief of the journal Clinical Trials. He has conducted research on the role of BRCA genetic variants in the development of breast cancer, as well as racial disparities in cancer survival rates in the United States.

Begg was named a Fellow of the American Statistical Association in 1996.
