= Per Hage =

American anthropologist

Per Hage (October 9, 1935 - July 25, 2004), was an American anthropologist known for his kinship studies with mathematician Frank Harary. They researched the connections between anthropology and mathematics.

== Books with Harary ==
- Structural Models in Anthropology (1984) ISBN 978-0521273114
- Island Networks: Communication, Kinship, and Classification Structures in Oceania (2007) ISBN 978-0521033213
- Exchange in Oceania: A Graph Theoretic Analysis (1991)
