= Nancy Lessler =

American actress

Nancy Wallin Flores Lessler, better known as Nancy Flores, is an American professional dancer, actress, and mural painter. Lessler is a two-time champion of the Fred Astaire national competition in ballroom dancing. She has also appeared in the U.S. Air Force Band's Guest Artist Series when it focused on dancing. Flores and dancing partner Gary Gekhman, who appeared on ABC-TV's "Dancing with the Stars," received an award for their participation from Major General Darren W. McDew.

== Early life, education, and career launch ==
Lessler graduated from the Beard School in Orange, New Jersey (now Morristown-Beard School) in 1964. After studying painting at the Parsons School of Design, Lesser joined the Shipstads & Johnson Ice Follies, a touring ice show. She trained as an artist under Harriet and David Boyd at the Montclair Art Museum in Montclair, New Jersey. In 1968, Lesser received her bachelor's degree in psychology from Loyola College (now Loyola University Maryland) in Baltimore, Maryland.

== Dancing and acting career ==
Lessler won the 1988 Pro/Am International Competition for Latin American Dancing with her son, Tytus Bergstrom. She was also a national finalist for Latin American ballroom dance event at the U.S. Rising Star Latin American Ballroom Dance competition run by the National Dance Council of America.

Lessler performed in a production of the play Twelfth Night by the Shakespeare Theatre Company in Washington, D.C. Since 2005, she has also performed with the Washington National Opera at the Kennedy Center. Her performances with the National Opera include: Salome, Don Giovanni, The Flying Dutchman, Madama Butterfly, Aida, Samson and Dalilah, Die Fledermaus, Andrea Chenier, La Traviata, Lucrezia Borgia, Luisa Fernanda, Hamlet, and Macbeth.

== Painting achievements ==
Lessler painted 24 panels for the hallways of the St. George's Hotel in Volcano, California between 1968 and 2004. She designed the backdrop used by R&B singer Alicia Keys' performance at the 44th Annual Grammy Awards ceremony in Los Angeles. Lessler also painted five covers of Dancing USA Magazine and created 35 paintings used to illustrate dance movements by Dancebook 2001, a reference guide for dance professionals and dance instructors.

== Family ==
Lessler married Mark Lessler, who worked as a special agent with the Criminal Investigative Division at the Internal Revenue Service. Nancy has a son, Tytus Bergstrom.
