= Matrigel =

Extracellular matrix

Matrigel is the trade name for the solubilized basement membrane matrix secreted by Engelbreth-Holm-Swarm (EHS) mouse sarcoma cells produced by Corning Life Sciences. Matrigel resembles the laminin/collagen IV-rich basement membrane extracellular environment found in many tissues and is used by cell biologists as a substrate (basement membrane matrix) for culturing cells.

== Cell culture ==
A common laboratory procedure is to dispense small volumes of chilled (4 °C) liquid Matrigel onto plastic tissue culture labware. When incubated at 37 °C (body temperature) the Matrigel proteins polymerize (solidify) producing a recombinant basement membrane that covers the labware's surface.

Cells cultured on Matrigel demonstrate complex cellular behavior that is otherwise difficult to observe under laboratory conditions. For example, endothelial cells create intricate spiderweb-like networks on Matrigel-coated surfaces but not on plastic surfaces. Such networks are highly suggestive of the microvascular capillary systems that suffuse living tissues with blood. Hence, Matrigel allows them to observe the process by which endothelial cells construct such networks that are of great research interest.

== Metastasis model ==
In some instances researchers may prefer to use greater volumes of Matrigel to produce thick three-dimensional gels. Thick gels induce cells to migrate from the gel's surface to its interior. This migratory behavior is studied by researchers as a model of tumor cell metastasis.

== Cancer drug screening ==
Pharmaceutical scientists use Matrigel to screen drug molecules. A typical experiment consists of adding a test molecule to Matrigel and observing cellular behavior. Test molecules that promote endothelial cell network formation are candidates for tissue regeneration therapies whereas test molecules that inhibit endothelial cell network formation are candidates for anti-cancer therapies. Likewise, test molecules that inhibit tumor cell migration may also have potential as anti-cancer drugs. Matrigel is also commonly used to prepare human tumor xenografts in rodents as part of a cancer drug discovery program. Matrigel is mixed with immortalized human cancer cells and the mixture is injected subcutaneously in immunodeficient mice. A human tumor usually forms in two to four weeks. This model system allows a researcher to test an anti-cancer compound in a surrogate host.

== Constituents ==
The ability of Matrigel to stimulate complex cell behavior is a consequence of its heterogeneous composition. The chief components of Matrigel are structural proteins such as laminin, nidogen, collagen and heparan sulfate proteoglycans which present cultured cells with the adhesive peptide sequences that they would encounter in their natural environment. Also present are growth factors like TGF-beta and EGF that prevent differentiation and promote proliferation of many cell types. A growth-factor-reduced Matrigel is also available. Matrigel contains other proteins in small amounts and its exact composition can vary from lot to lot. For this reason, Matrigel may not be appropriate for experiments that require precise knowledge of all proteins and concentrations.

== Embryonic stem cells ==
Matrigel is also used as an attachment substrate in embryonic stem cell culture. When embryonic stem cells are grown in the absence of feeder cells, extracellular matrix components are needed to maintain the pluripotent, undifferentiated state (self-renewal). One of these matrices that can be used is diluted Matrigel. When used undiluted, Matrigel promotes stem cell growth and differentiation.

== See also ==
- Hynda Kleinman, co-inventor
- Cultrex
- Myogel
