= Clinical Trials (journal) =

- Discipline: Clinical trials, medical research methodology
- Language: English
- Edited by: Colin Begg

Publication details
- History: 2004–present
- Publisher: SAGE Publications
- Frequency: Bimonthly
- Impact factor: 2.715 (2016)

Standard abbreviations
- ISO 4: Clin. Trials

Indexing
- ISSN: 1740-7745
- LCCN: 2004256012
- OCLC no.: 300861591

Links
- Journal homepage; Online access; Online archive; Society website

Clinical Trials, subtitled as Journal of the Society for Clinical Trials, is a peer-reviewed academic journal covering clinical trials and related subjects in the field of medical research methodology. It is published six times a year by SAGE Publications on behalf of The Society for Clinical Trials (SCT). The journal's main editor is Colin Begg (Memorial Sloan Kettering Cancer Center).

== Abstracting and indexing ==
Clinical Trials is abstracted and indexed in: Current Contents, MEDLINE, Scopus, and the Social Sciences Citation Index. According to the Journal Citation Reports, its 2016 impact factor is 2.715, ranking it 56th out of 128 journals in the category "Medicine, Research & Experimental".

== Scope ==
Clinical Trials is dedicated to advancing knowledge on the design and conduct of clinical trials related research methodologies. Covering the design, conduct, analysis, synthesis and evaluation of key methodologies, the journal remains on the cusp of the latest topics, including ethics, regulation and policy impact.
