= Mitchell H. Gail =

American physician-scientist and biostatistician

Mitchell H. Gail is an American physician-scientist and biostatistician. He is a distinguished investigator at the National Cancer Institute.

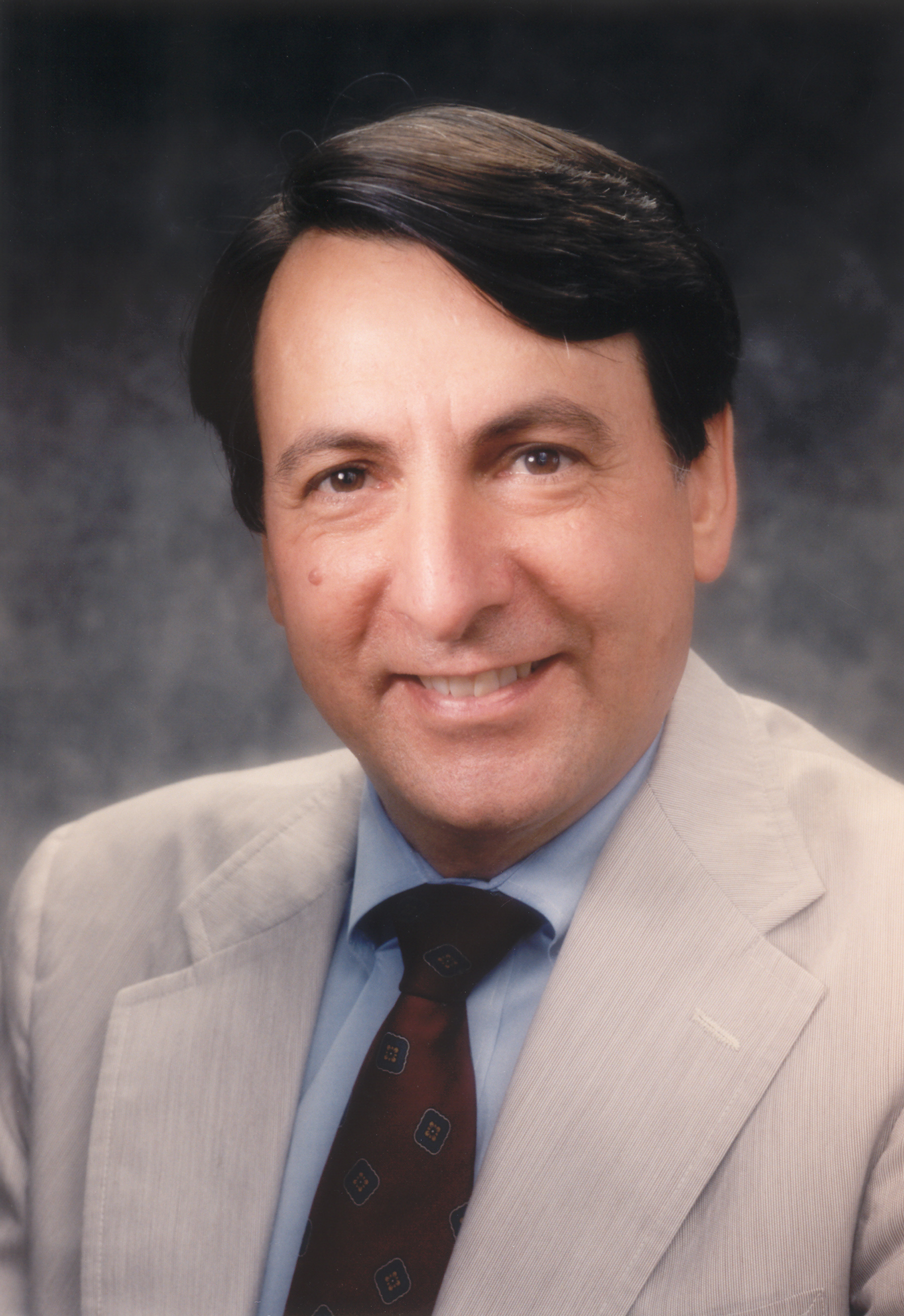

== Life ==
Gail completed a M.D. from Harvard Medical School in 1968 and a Ph.D. in statistics from George Washington University in 1977. He joined the National Cancer Institute (NCI) in 1969, and served as chief of the biostatistics branch from 1994 to 2008. Gail is a Fellow and former President of the American Statistical Association, a Fellow of the American Association for the Advancement of Science, an elected member of the American Society for Clinical Investigation, and an elected member of the National Academy of Medicine. He has received the Spiegelman Gold Medal for Health Statistics, the Snedecor Award for applied statistical research, the Howard Temin Award for AIDS Research, the NIH Director's Award, the Public Health Service Distinguished Service Medal, the Nathan Mantel Lifetime Achievement Award, the NIH Robert S. Gordon Jr. Lecture in Epidemiology, and the AACR - American Cancer Society Award for Research Excellence in Cancer Epidemiology and Prevention. He was named an NIH Distinguished Investigator in 2019.

== Selected works ==
- Pfeiffer, Ruth M.; Gail, Mitchell H. (2017). Absolute Risk: Methods and Applications in Clinical Management and Public Health. CRC Press. ISBN 978-1-4665-6168-7.
