= Resentful demoralization =

Resentful demoralization is an issue in controlled experiments in which those in the control group become resentful of not receiving the experimental treatment. Alternatively, the experimental group could be resentful of the control group, if the experimental group perceive its treatment as inferior. They may become angry, depressed, uncooperative, or non-compliant. This may lead to significant systematic differences in the outcome of the control group, obscuring the results of the study and threatening their validity.

== See also ==
- Clinical trial
- Randomized controlled trial
