= Norman Breslow =

American statistician and medical researcher

Norman E. Breslow
- Born: February 21, 1941
- Died: December 9, 2015 (aged 74)
- Education: Stanford University
- Awards: Snedecor Award (1995)
- Scientific career
- Fields: Statistics
- Workplaces: University of Washington
- Doctoral advisor: Bradley Efron
- Doctoral students: Nilanjan Chatterjee; Jinbo Chen; Kung-Yee Liang; Xihong Lin; Bruce G. Lindsay

Norman Edward Breslow (February 21, 1941 – December 9, 2015) was an American statistician and medical researcher. At the time of his death, he was Professor (Emeritus) of Biostatistics in the School of Public Health, of the University of Washington. He is co-author or author of hundreds of published works during 1967 to 2015.

Among his many accomplishments is his work with co-author Nicholas Day that developed and popularized the use of case-control matched sample research designs, in the two-volume work Statistical Methods in Cancer Research. This was with a view that matched sample studies have a role within larger programs of many types of studies, in making progress on a vast and important problem like cancer. Matched sample studies can quickly and cheaply test some hypothesized relationships, but their apparent findings are not definitive, and there is much they cannot accomplish. Their results, however, can inform the design of slow and expensive longitudinal large-cohort studies that are definitive, for example. Dose-response studies and other studies, too, are elements of a rational scientific program to address cancer. In 2015, he died of prostate cancer.

Breslow was an Honorary Fellow of the Royal Statistical Society of the U.K. His other professional awards an honors include: ``the Speigelman Gold Medal Award from the American Public Health Association (1978); the Snedecor Award (1995) and R.A. Fisher Award (1995) from the Committee of Presidents of Statistical Societies; the Nathan Mantel Award (2002) from the ASA Section on Statistics in Epidemiology; the Marvin Zelen Leadership Award in Statistical Science from Harvard University (2008); and the Medal of Honor, International Agency for Research on Cancer (2005)". He was also a fellow of the American Association for the Advancement of Science at the same time as his father, Lester Breslow.
