= Brian Caffo =

Biostatistician

- Education: University of Florida
- Awards: Presidential Early Career Award for Scientists and Engineers (2011)
- Scientific career
- Fields: Biostatistics
- Workplaces: Johns Hopkins Bloomberg School of Public Health
- Thesis: Candidate sampling schemes and some important applications (2001)
- Doctoral advisor: James G. Booth

Brian Caffo is a professor in the Department of Biostatistics at the Johns Hopkins Bloomberg School of Public Health. He graduated from the Department of Statistics at the University of Florida in 2001, and from the Department of Mathematics at UF in 1995. His doctoral advisor was James G. Booth. He works in the fields of computational statistics and neuroinformatics and co-created the SMART working group. He has been the recipient of the Presidential Early Career Award for Scientists and Engineers, Johns Hopkins Bloomberg School of Public Health Golden Apple and AMTRA teaching awards.

He teaches several open online courses on the online learning platform Coursera, including: Mathematical Biostatistics Boot Camp 1; Mathematical Biostatistics Boot Camp 2; Advanced Linear Models for Data Science 1: Least Squares; Advanced Linear Models for Data Science 2: Statistical Linear Models; Statistical Inference; Regression Models; Developing Data Products.
