= Cluster-randomised controlled trial =

Form of scientific experiment

A cluster-randomised controlled trial (cRCT, CRCT) is a type of randomised controlled trial in which groups of subjects (as opposed to individual subjects) are randomised. Cluster randomised controlled trials are also known as cluster-randomised trials, group-randomised trials, and place-randomized trials. Cluster-randomised controlled trials are used when there is a strong reason for randomising treatment and control groups over randomising participants.

== Prevalence ==
A 2004 bibliometric study documented an increasing number of publications in the medical literature on cluster-randomised controlled trials since the 1980s.

== Advantages ==
Advantages of cluster-randomised controlled trials over individually randomised controlled trials include:

- The ability to study interventions that cannot be directed toward selected individuals (e.g., a radio show about lifestyle changes) and the ability to control for "contamination" across individuals (e.g., one individual's changing behaviors may influence another individual to do so).
- Reduced cost in running a survey. For example, when wanting to survey households, it could often be cheaper to choose street blocks and survey all the houses there in order to reduce the cost of traveling for the people conducting the survey.
- Sometimes due to data availability, it is only possible to do cluster sampling. For example, if wanting to survey households, it may be that there is no census list of houses (due to privacy restrictions of the Bureau of Statistics of the country). However, there may be a public record of street blocks and their addresses, and these can be used for creating the sampling frame.

== Disadvantages ==
Disadvantages compared with individually randomised controlled trials include greater complexity in design and analysis, and a requirement for more participants to obtain the same statistical power. Use of this type of trial also means that the experiences of individuals within the same group are likely similar, leading to correlated results. This correlation is measured by the intraclass correlation, also known as the intracluster correlation. Though this correlation is a known component of cluster-randomised controlled trials, a large proportion of the trials fail to account for it. Failing to control for intraclass correlation negatively affects both the statistical power and the incidence of Type I errors of an analysis.

== See also ==
- Randomized controlled trial
- Statistics
- Zelen's design
