= Gerald Weissmann =

Austrian-born American physician/scientist, editor and essayist

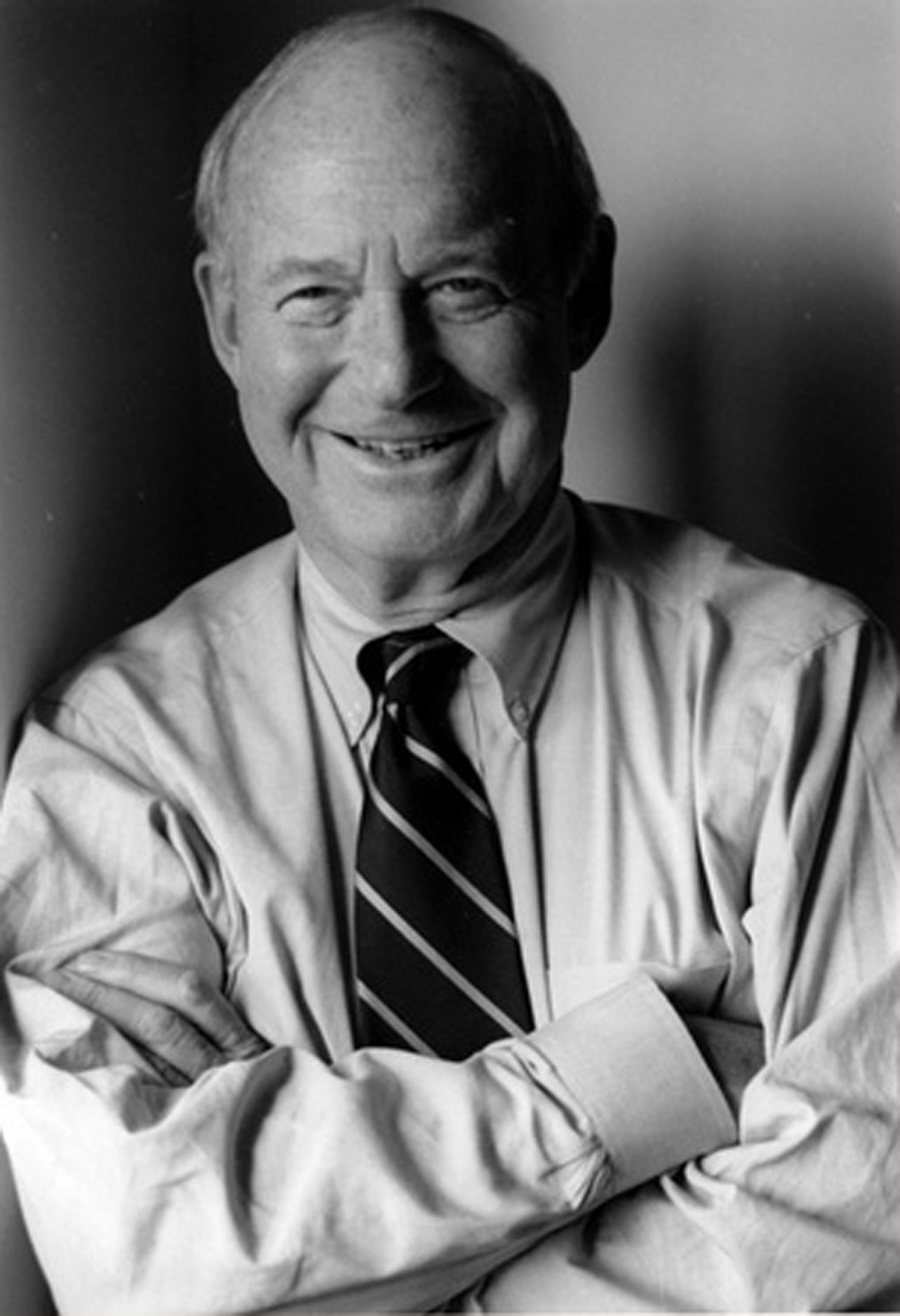
- Gerald Weissmann
- Born: August 7, 1930; Vienna, Austria
- Died: July 10, 2019 (aged 88)
- Education: Columbia University; New York University School of Medicine
- Known for: Complement system Inflammation; Rheumatoid arthritis Systemic lupus erythematosus Liposome
- Spouse: Ann (Raphael) Weissmann (2 children)
- Awards: Royal Society of Medicine; American College of Rheumatology; New York Academy of Medicine; New York Academy of Sciences; American Academy of Arts and Sciences
- Scientific career
- Fields: Immunology; Rheumatology; Medicine
- Workplaces: Mount Sinai Hospital (Manhattan); Medical Corps (United States Army); Strangeways Research Laboratory; Marine Biological Laboratory; Élan; New York University School of Medicine

Gerald Weissmann (August 7, 1930 – July 10, 2019) was an Austrian-born American physician/scientist, editor, and essayist. He was Professor Emeritus and Research Professor of Medicine (Rheumatology) at New York University School of Medicine. He was editor-in-chief (2006–16) of The FASEB Journal. At the time of his death he was its book review editor. In 1965, he was one of the discoverers of liposomes and is credited with coining that term.

== Early life and education ==
Weissmann was born in Vienna, Austria, on August 7, 1930, to Adolf and Greta (Lustbader) Weissmann. His family, being Jewish, fled the Nazis and immigrated to the United States in 1938, and Gerald and his family became naturalized American citizens in 1943. After attending the Bronx High School of Science, he received a B.A. from Columbia University in 1950 and an M.D. from New York University (NYU) in 1954. He also pursued an early career in art, exhibiting at a major New York gallery.

== Career ==
After clinical training at Mount Sinai Hospital, in New York City, and active service as captain in the U.S. Army Medical Corps, he did a research fellowship in the Department of Biochemistry at NYU. (1958–59) under Nobel laureate Severo Ochoa. Lewis Thomas then selected him as chief medical resident at Bellevue Hospital Center (1959–60). Weissmann next worked at the Strangeways Research Laboratory, in Cambridge, England, studying cell biology under Dame Honor B. Fell until 1962. He then returned to the NYU School of Medicine, joining its faculty, where he remained for the rest of his career. In 1964 and 1969, he was a visiting investigator at the Babraham Institute in Cambridge, England; in 1973-1974 he was awarded a Guggenheim Foundation scholarship at the Centre de Physiologie et d'Immunologie Cellulaires, Hôpital Saint-Antoine at Sorbonne University, Paris, as a visiting investigator; and as visiting fellow at the William Harvey Research Institute at the Queen Mary University of London, in 1987.

Weissmann became Professor of Medicine at NYU in 1970, and served as director of the Division of Rheumatology from 1973 to 1999. Starting in 1970, he spent summers as an investigator and lecturer and served for 18 years as a trustee (later emeritus) of the Marine Biological Laboratory Woods Hole, MA. He was best known for having presented evidence that rheumatoid arthritis is an immune-complex disease (provoked perhaps by genetic programs that misdirect immune responses to oral bacteria). His laboratory found that crises in systemic lupus erythematosus are provoked by intravascular complement activation. Using a tissue culture system containing a mixture of both leukocytes and endothelial cells, he pioneered studies in both leukocyte activation (via complement component 5a, immune complexes, etc.), and the role of salicylates and corticosteroids in cell signaling and adhesion (NF-κB and MAP kinases of MAPK3, MAPK1, and mitogen-activated protein kinase kinase).

He was responsible for the co-discovery of liposomes in 1965 and credited with coining that name by the Oxford Dictionary of the English Language (1965). He was a founder (with E.C. Whitehead) and a director of the Liposome Company, Inc. (purchased by Élan in 2000), from 1982 to 2000. Two of its drugs, based on his work with liposomes, Abelcet and Myocet, are in clinical use. There are now over 940,000 references to liposomes on Google scholar Liposomes have been recognized for offering "one of the most successful drug delivery systems (DDS) given their established utility and success in the clinic in the past 40-50 years." Weissmann has been acknowledged as "Liposome's Literary Founder."

Dr. Weissmann has received the Lila Gruber Award for Cancer Research two residencies at the Rockefeller Foundation Study Center at Bellagio, the Alessandro Robecchi and Paul Klemperer awards for inflammation research, as well as the Distinguished Investigator and Presidential Gold Medal Awards of the American College of Rheumatology. He is a foreign member of the Accademia Nazionale dei Lincei of Rome and the Royal Society of Medicine of London. He was a master and past president of the American College of Rheumatology, a past president of the Harvey Society, a fellow of the American Academy of Arts and Sciences, The New York Academy of Medicine and The New York Academy of Sciences. With Joshua Lederberg, he was a founding member of the advisory boards of the Pew Scholars in Biomedical Sciences, the Ellison Medical Foundation, and was the founding chairman of the jury for the Prix Galien Prix Galien USA.

From 1975 to 2001, Weissmann was the founding editor of the journal, Inflammation; from 1979 to 1984, he edited MD Magazine, and from 2006 to 2016 he served as editor-in-chief of The FASEB Journal. At the time of his death, he was the book review editor of that journal.

== Essays ==
A member of PEN, Weissmann has published essays and reviews of cultural history in The New Republic, the London Review of Books, and The New York Times Book Review. His work has been collected in eleven volumes, among them The Woods Hole Cantata (1985) and The Fevers of Reason (2018). Recently, he has edited a special issue of The European Review < Volume 27 / Issue 1, February 2019> that revisits C.P. Snow's "Two Cultures and the Scientific Revolution" after 60 years. His work was praised for scientific insight by Jonas Salk, for literary style by Kurt Vonnegut, and for breadth of general culture by Adam Gopnik. His published volumes of essays include:

- The Woods Hole Cantata (1985) ISBN 9780396086185
- They All Laughed at Christopher Columbus (1987) ISBN 9780812916188
- The Doctor With Two Heads (1990) ISBN 9780679733911
- The Doctor Dilemma (1992) ISBN 9781879736054
- Democracy and DNA (1995) ISBN 9780809093052
- Darwin's Audubon (2002) ISBN 9780738205977
- The Year of the Genome (2002) ISBN 9780805072921
- Galileo's Gout: Science in an Age of Endarkenment (2007) ISBN 9781934137000
- Mortal and Immortal DNA (2009) ISBN 9781934137161
- Epigenetics in the Age of Twitter (2012) ISBN 9781934137390
- The Fevers of Reason (2018) ISBN 9781942658320

== Personal life ==
He married Ann Weissmann (née Raphael) in 1953, and together they had two children: Lisa Beth Weissmann, MD, of Mount Auburn Hospital, Cambridge, MA and Andrew Weissmann, distinguished senior fellow at the NYU School of Law.

== Death ==
He died on July 10, 2019.
