= John T. Dingle =

British biologist and rheumatologist

- Citizenship: British
- Known for: Physiology of arthritis
- Scientific career
- Fields: Biochemistry, rheumatology
- Institutions: Strangeways Research Laboratory, Cambridge, Hughes Hall, Cambridge

John T. Dingle is a British biologist and rheumatologist. He joined the staff of the Strangeways Research Laboratory in 1959 as a research assistant to then-director Honor Fell, and later himself served as director from 1979 to 1993, taking over the position after the death of Michael Abercrombie. His presence at Strangeways helped to move its research direction toward the original research interests of its founder, Thomas Strangeways, who sought to understand the physiology of arthritis and other rheumatic diseases, after many years in which the laboratory specialized more narrowly in tissue culture and cell biology. Dingle was the president of Hughes Hall from 1993 to 1998, and is an honorary fellow. He was the founding chairman of the British Connective Tissue Society (now the British Society for Matrix Biology), serving from 1980 to 1987. From 1975 to 1982 he was Chairman of the Editorial Board of the Biochemical Journal. Among his notable trainees is University of California, San Francisco cell biologist Zena Werb, who was a postdoctoral fellow with Dingle and subsequently worked as a research assistant at Strangeways.
