= Frederick Gordon Spear =

Frederick Gordon Spear (often F. Gordon Spear or F.G. Spear; 1895–1980) was a British physician and researcher. Originally trained in tropical medicine, he spent time working in what was then the Belgian Congo. After his return to England in 1923, he became interested in radiology and radiobiology. As a member of the Medical Research Council, he was involved in the decision to continue work at Strangeways Research Laboratory following the 1926 death of founder Thomas Strangeways. He served as deputy director under the laboratory's longtime director Honor Fell from 1931 to 1958. While at Strangeways he conducted experiments on the effects of radiation on cells and tissues, particularly tissue cultures derived from cancers. He was known for forceful rhetoric in support of the then-controversial field of tissue culture and its potential in informing clinical practice.
