= Zena Werb =

German-born cell biologist

- Born: March 24, 1945; KZ Bergen-Belsen
- Died: 16 June 2020 (aged 75); San Francisco, California, United States
- Education: University of Toronto; Rockefeller University
- Known for: Study of the extracellular matrix
- Awards: E.B. Wilson Medal, 2007
- Scientific career
- Fields: Cell biology
- Workplaces: University of California, San Francisco
- Thesis: Dynamics of macrophage membrane cholesterol (1971)
- Doctoral advisor: Zanvil Cohn
- Website: werblab.ucsf.edu

Zena Werb (24 March 1945 – 16 June 2020) was a professor and the Vice Chair of Anatomy at the University of California, San Francisco. She was also the co-leader of the Cancer, Immunity, and Microenvironment Program at the Hellen Diller Family Comprehensive Cancer Center and a member of the Executive Committee of the Sabre-Sandler Asthma Basic Research Center at UCSF. Her research focused on features of the microenvironment surrounding cells, with particular interest in the extracellular matrix and the role of its protease enzymes in cell signaling.

== Early life and education ==
Zena Werb was born in Germany in 1945 in the Bergen-Belsen concentration camp (KZ Bergen-Belsen), a few weeks before the camp was liberated. Both of her parents, who were Polish-Jewish, survived the war, with her father having fled to Italy. Her family was able to reunite at a refugee camp in Italy in 1947; they emigrated to Canada in 1948, where Werb was raised on a farm in Ontario. Though her father was previously a mathematician, he became a farmer.

Werb received her B.Sc. in Biochemistry from the University of Toronto in 1966, having changed her major from geophysics after being told there were no accommodations for women at a field site. She received her Ph.D. in Cell Biology from Rockefeller University in 1971, working under the supervision of Zanvil Cohn on a thesis titled "Dynamics of macrophage membrane cholesterol". After graduation she worked at the Strangeways Research Laboratory in Cambridge, United Kingdom as a postdoctoral fellow with John T. Dingle from 1971 to 1973 and as a research associate from 1973 to 1975.

== Academic career ==
Werb spent a year as a visiting assistant professor at Dartmouth Medical School in New Hampshire before moving to the University of California, San Francisco in 1976, where she became a full professor in 1983. She served as president of the American Society for Cell Biology in 2004. She spoke of the value of academic sabbaticals, and in 2007 she spent a sabbatical at the Max Planck Institute through an Alexander von Humboldt Research Award.

Werb wrote and gave interviews on her experiences as a woman in science, describing the environment in which she trained as sexist and noting that, despite improvements in women's representation in the sciences since her training, sexism "has gone underground" and low representation of women in top positions remains a problem.

She was a member of the Editorial Board for Developmental Cell.

== Awards and honors ==
- FASEB Excellence in Science Award from the Federation of American Societies for Experimental Biology (1966)
- Guggenheim Fellowship (1985-6)
- American Association for Cancer Research Women in Cancer Research Charlotte Friend Memorial Lectureship (2001)
- UCSF Annual Faculty Research Lectureship (2001)
- Fellow of the American Academy of Arts and Sciences (2003)
- E.B. Wilson Medal from the American Society for Cell Biology (2007)
- Lifetime Achievement Award from Women in Cell Biology, an ASCB subgroup (2010)
- Member of the United States National Academy of Sciences (2010)
- UCSF Lifetime Achievement in Mentoring Award (2015)

== Research ==
Werb's research group studies the effects on cells of the extracellular matrix microenvironment and its component proteases, particularly matrix metalloproteinases. The group also investigates the role of these effects on biological processes such as stem cell maturation and neoplasia, for which they use breast cancer in mice as a model. Her work in establishing the active role of the ECM in normal cell signaling and in cancer progression is widely recognized as highly influential.
