= Tumor necrosis factor receptor 2 =

Membrane receptor protein found in humans

TNFRSF1B

Identifiers
- Aliases: TNFRSF1B, CD120b, TBPII, TNF-R-II, TNF-R75, TNFBR, TNFR1B, TNFR2, TNFR80, p75, p75TNFR, tumor necrosis factor receptor superfamily member 1B, TNF receptor superfamily member 1B
- External IDs: OMIM: 191191; MGI: 1314883; GeneCards: TNFRSF1B
Available structures
PDB	Ortholog search: PDBe RCSB
PDB	List of PDB id codes 1CA9, 3ALQ

Gene location (Human)
Chr.	Chromosome 1 (human)
Band	1p36.22	Start	12,166,991 bp
Band	1p36.22	End	12,209,228 bp

Gene location (Mouse)
Chr.	Chromosome 4 (mouse)
Band	4 E1|4 78.17 cM	Start	144,940,033 bp
Band	4 E1|4 78.17 cM	End	144,973,440 bp
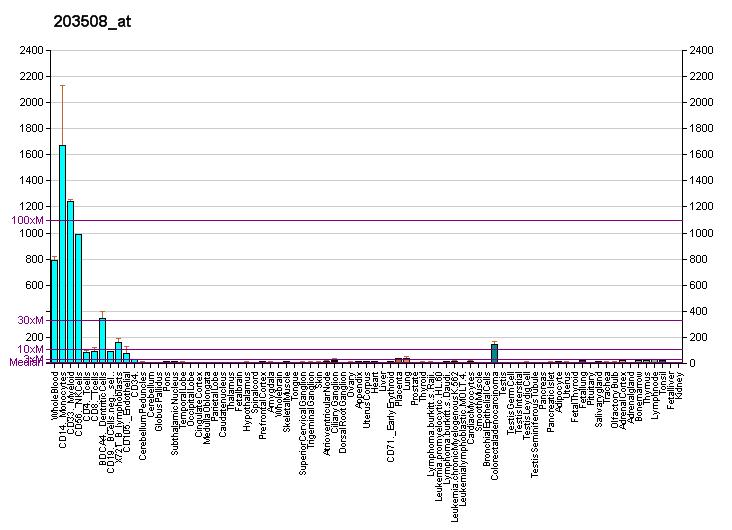
RNA expression pattern
Bgee	Human / Mouse (ortholog); Top expressed in: granulocyte; monocyte; blood; spleen; appendix; tendon of biceps brachii; right lung; lymph node; subcutaneous adipose tissue; periodontal fiber / Top expressed in: decidua; stroma of bone marrow; aortic valve; granulocyte; gastrula; blood; mesenteric lymph nodes; spleen; ascending aorta; internal carotid artery; More reference expression data
BioGPS	More reference expression data
Gene ontology
Molecular function	protein binding; ubiquitin protein ligase binding; tumor necrosis factor-activated receptor activity; tumor necrosis factor binding
Cellular component	integral component of membrane; membrane; plasma membrane; integral component of plasma membrane; varicosity; extracellular region; axon; soma; perinuclear region of cytoplasm; membrane raft; nucleus; specific granule membrane; tumor necrosis factor receptor superfamily complex
Biological process	extrinsic apoptotic signaling pathway; RNA destabilization; cellular response to growth factor stimulus; positive regulation of membrane protein ectodomain proteolysis; ageing; multicellular organism development; cell surface receptor signaling pathway; response to lipopolysaccharide; regulation of cell population proliferation; immune response; intrinsic apoptotic signaling pathway in response to DNA damage; apoptotic signaling pathway; inflammatory response; cellular response to lipopolysaccharide; negative regulation of inflammatory response; apoptotic process; tumor necrosis factor-mediated signaling pathway; neutrophil degranulation; negative regulation of cysteine-type endopeptidase activity involved in apoptotic process; cytokine-mediated signaling pathway; aortic valve development; pulmonary valve development; negative regulation of extracellular matrix constituent secretion; negative regulation of cardiac muscle hypertrophy; positive regulation of apoptotic process involved in morphogenesis; regulation of T cell cytokine production; regulation of myelination; regulation of T cell proliferation; regulation of neuroinflammatory response; cellular response to tumor necrosis factor; positive regulation of myelination; positive regulation of oligodendrocyte differentiation; negative regulation of cell death; negative regulation of neuroinflammatory response; glial cell-neuron signaling; negative regulation of neuron death; regulation of RNA biosynthetic process
Sources:Amigo / QuickGO
Orthologs
Databases	NCBI: entry; OMA: entry
Species	Human	Mouse
Entrez	7133	21938
Ensembl	ENSG00000028137	ENSMUSG00000028599
UniProt	P20333	P25119
RefSeq (mRNA)	NM_001066	NM_011610
RefSeq (protein)	NP_001057	NP_035740
Location (UCSC)	Chr 1: 12.17 – 12.21 Mb	Chr 4: 144.94 – 144.97 Mb
PubMed search
- Wikidata
View/Edit Human	View/Edit Mouse

Tumor necrosis factor receptor 2 (TNFR2), also known as tumor necrosis factor receptor superfamily member 1B (TNFRSF1B) and CD120b, is one of two membrane receptors that binds tumor necrosis factor-alpha (TNFα). Like its counterpart, tumor necrosis factor receptor 1 (TNFR1), the extracellular region of TNFR2 consists of four cysteine-rich domains which allow for binding to TNFα. TNFR1 and TNFR2 possess different functions when bound to TNFα due to differences in their intracellular structures, such as TNFR2 lacking a death domain (DD).

== Function ==
The protein encoded by this gene is a member of the tumor necrosis factor receptor superfamily, which also contains TNFRSF1A. This protein and TNF-receptor 1 form a heterocomplex that mediates the recruitment of two anti-apoptotic proteins, c-IAP1 and c-IAP2, which possess E3 ubiquitin ligase activity. The function of IAPs in TNF-receptor signalling is unknown, however, c-IAP1 is thought to potentiate TNF-induced apoptosis by the ubiquitination and degradation of TNF-receptor-associated factor 2 (TRAF2), which mediates anti-apoptotic signals. Knockout studies in mice also suggest a role of this protein in protecting neurons from apoptosis by stimulating antioxidative pathways.

== Clinical significance ==
=== CNS ===
At least partly because TNFR2 has no intracellular death domain, TNFR2 is neuroprotective.

Patients with schizophrenia have increased levels of soluble tumor necrosis factor receptor 2 (sTNFR2).

=== Cancer ===
Targeting of TNFR2 in tumor cells is associated with increased tumor cell death and decreased progression of tumor cell growth.

Increased expression of TNFR2 is found in breast cancer, cervical cancer, colon cancer, and renal cancer. A link between the expression of TNFR2 in tumor cells and late-stage cancer has been discovered. Soluble TNFR2 or sTNFR2 expression was has been found to be significally higher in acute adult T-cell leukemia/lymphoma patients' blood and cellular assays compared to remission and carrier states. TNFR2 plays a significant role in tumor cell growth as it has been found that the loss of TNFR2 expression is linked with increased death of associated tumor cells and a significant standstill of further growth. There is therapeutic potential in the targeting of TNFR2 for cancer treatments through TNFR2 inhibition.

=== Systemic lupus erythematous (SLE) ===
A small scale study of 289 Japanese patients suggested a minor increased predisposition from an amino acid substitution of the 196 allele at exon 6. Genomic testing of 81 SLE patients and 207 healthy patients in a Japanese study showed 37% of SLE patients had a polymorphism on position 196 of exon 6 compared to 18.8% of healthy patients. The TNFR2 196R allele polymorphism suggests that even one 196R allele results in increased risk for SLE.

== Interactions ==
TNFRSF1B has been shown to interact with:

- TRAF2, and
- TTRAP.
