= Odyneromyia =

Scientific classification
- Kingdom: Animalia
- Phylum: Arthropoda
- Clade: Pancrustacea
- Class: Insecta
- Order: Diptera
- Family: Syrphidae
- Subfamily: Eristalinae
- Tribe: Milesiini
- Subtribe: Temnostomina
- Genus: Odyneromyia; Shannon & Aubertin, 1933

Type species
- Doros odyneroides Philippi, 1865

Genus of flies

Odyneromyia is a genus of hoverflies in the family Syrphidae.

== Species ==
- Subgenus Austroxylota

- Odyneromyia illucens (Ferguson, 1926)
- Odyneromyia iridescens (Ferguson, 1926)
- Odyneromyia spadix (Hardy, 1921)
- Odyneromyia transparens (Paramonov, 1955)

- Subgenus Odyneromyia Shannon & Aubertin, 1933

- Odyneromyia odyneroides (Philippi, 1865)
- Odyneromyia valdiviformis Shannon & Aubertin, 1933
