= Odyneromyia spadix =

Scientific classification
- Kingdom: Animalia
- Phylum: Arthropoda
- Clade: Pancrustacea
- Class: Insecta
- Order: Diptera
- Family: Syrphidae
- Subfamily: Eristalinae
- Tribe: Milesiini
- Subtribe: Temnostomina
- Genus: Odyneromyia
- Species: O. spadix

Binomial name
- Odyneromyia spadix (Hardy, 1921)

Synonyms
- Criorrhina spadix Hardy, 1921

Species of fly

Odyneromyia spadix is a species of hoverfly in the family Syrphidae.

== Distribution ==
Australia.
