= Ofranergene obadenovec =

Gene therapy

Ofranergene obadenovec, also known as VB-111, is an anti-angiogenic gene therapy.

The vector is a non-replicating adenovirus 5. The payload is a chimeric gene encoding a fusion protein that combines the extracellular and intramembrane domains of the human TNF receptor 1 and the intracellular domain of the Fas receptor, under the control of a modified version of the murine promoter for endothelin-1, which is called PPE-1. PPE-1 drives tissues specific expression and also has a hypoxia responsive element. The FasR part of the payload is intended to drive cell death in the endothelium of blood vessels where the chimeric protein is expressed; the TNF-R1 part is intended to provide some tumor specificity.

Phase I trial results were presented in 2010 and as of 2011 Phase II trials in metastatic thyroid cancer had been started.

It was granted fast track designation and orphan drug status by the FDA in 2013 for treatment of glioblastoma multiforme.

It is under development by an Israeli company called Vascular Biogenics, also called VBL Therapeutics. The company was founded in 2000 by Dror Harats and Jacob George; it tried to hold an IPO on NASDAQ under the Jobs Act in August 2014, but the offering failed and was withdrawn after the stock had traded for six days. The company made a successful offering in September 2014 and raised $40 million.
