= TACE =

Tace or TACE may refer to:

- Transcatheter arterial chemoembolization, a medical procedure
- ADAM 17 endopeptidase, an enzyme
- Chlorotrianisene, a synthetic estrogen
- Tamil All Character Encoding - TACE-16
