= CD120 =

Protein family

tumor necrosis factor receptor superfamily, member 1A

Identifiers
- Symbol: TNFRSF1A
- Alt. symbols: CD120a, TNFR1
- NCBI gene: 7132
- HGNC: 11916
- OMIM: 191190
- RefSeq: NM_001065
- UniProt: P19438

Other data
- Locus: Chr. 12 p13.2
Search for
- Structures: Swiss-model
- Domains: InterPro

tumor necrosis factor receptor superfamily, member 1B

Identifiers
- Symbol: TNFRSF1B
- Alt. symbols: CD120a, TNFR2
- NCBI gene: 7133
- HGNC: 11917
- OMIM: 191191
- RefSeq: NM_001066
- UniProt: P20333

Other data
- Locus: Chr. 1 p36.22
Search for
- Structures: Swiss-model
- Domains: InterPro

CD120 (Cluster of Differentiation 120) can refer to two members of the tumor necrosis factor receptor superfamily: tumor necrosis factor receptor 1 (TNFR1) and tumor necrosis factor receptor 2 (TNFR2).

== Receptor subtypes ==
There are two variants of the receptor, each encoded by a separate gene:

- CD120a - TNFR1 - TNFR superfamily member 1A
- CD120b - TNFR2 - TNFR superfamily member 1B

TNFR1 is the receptor type responsible for mediation of TNF-alpha induced sickness behavior, and is involved in neurotoxic processes. Elevated levels of TNFR1 has been found in severe mental disorders.

== Signaling pathway ==
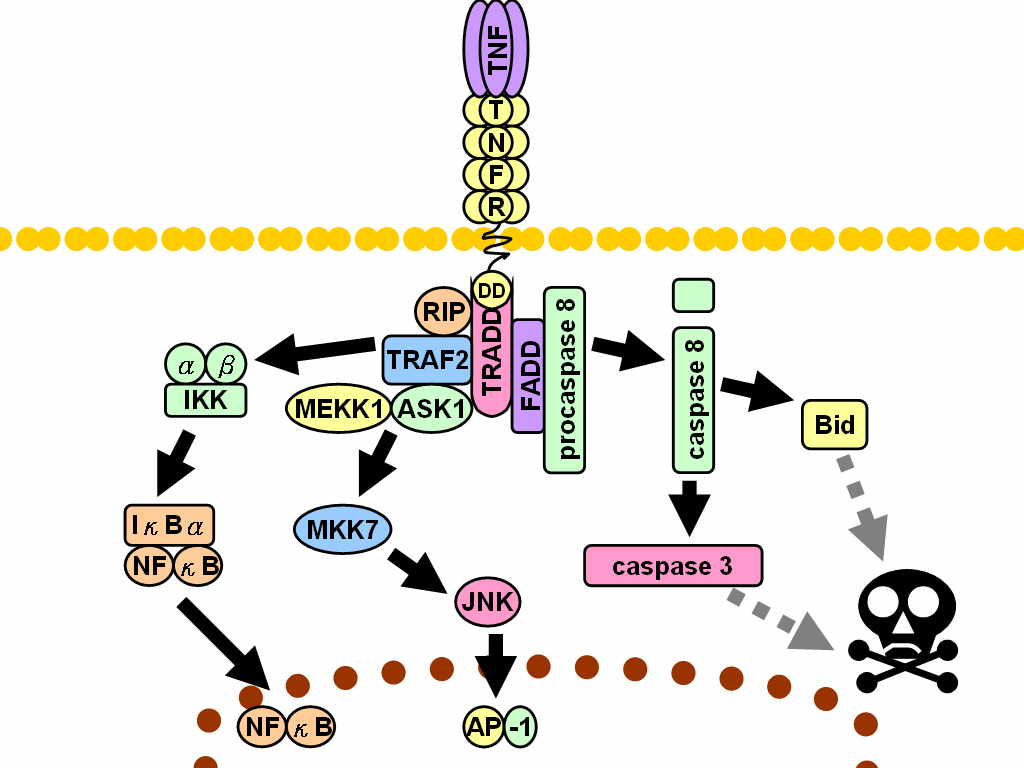
Signaling pathway of TNF-R1. Dashed grey lines represent multiple steps

== See also ==
- Cluster of differentiation
