= TRPC4AP =

Protein-coding gene in the species Homo sapiens

Identifiers
- Aliases: TRPC4AP, C20orf188, PPP1R158, TRRP4AP, TRUSS, transient receptor potential cation channel subfamily C member 4 associated protein
- External IDs: OMIM: 608430; MGI: 1930751; GeneCards: TRPC4AP

Gene location (Human)
Chr.	Chromosome 20 (human)
Band	20q11.22	Start	35,002,404 bp
Band	20q11.22	End	35,092,807 bp

Gene location (Mouse)
Chr.	Chromosome 2 (mouse)
Band	2 H1|2 77.26 cM	Start	155,476,191 bp
Band	2 H1|2 77.26 cM	End	155,534,304 bp
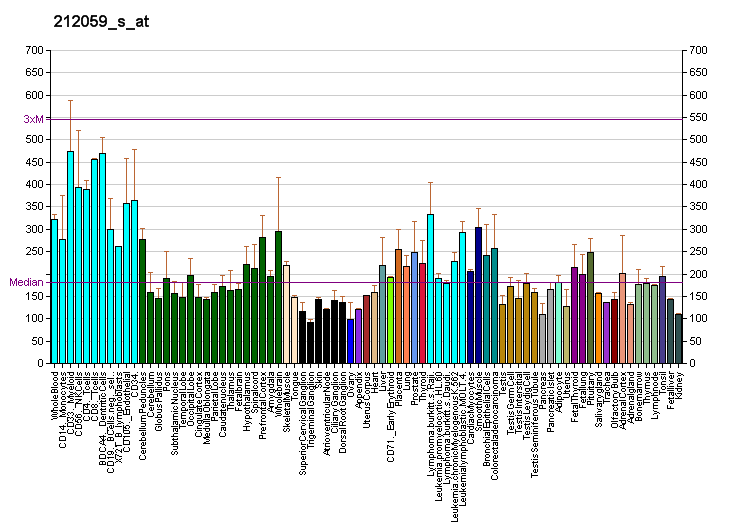
RNA expression pattern
Bgee	Human / Mouse (ortholog); Top expressed in: granulocyte; right adrenal cortex; anterior pituitary; gastric mucosa; body of pancreas; left adrenal gland; stromal cell of endometrium; left adrenal cortex; gastrocnemius muscle; upper lobe of left lung / Top expressed in: spermatocyte; muscle of thigh; entorhinal cortex; thymus; perirhinal cortex; CA3 field; granulocyte; cerebellar cortex; superior frontal gyrus; dentate gyrus of hippocampal formation granule cell; More reference expression data
BioGPS	More reference expression data
Gene ontology
Molecular function	phosphatase binding; protein binding; calcium channel activity
Cellular component	plasma membrane; Cul4A-RING E3 ubiquitin ligase complex
Biological process	calcium ion transmembrane transport; protein ubiquitination; hair follicle maturation; ubiquitin-dependent protein catabolic process
Sources:Amigo / QuickGO
Orthologs
Databases	NCBI: entry; OMA: entry
Species	Human	Mouse
Entrez	26133	56407
Ensembl	ENSG00000100991	ENSMUSG00000038324
UniProt	Q8TEL6	Q9JLV2
RefSeq (mRNA)	NM_015638; NM_199368	NM_001163452; NM_019828
RefSeq (protein)	NP_056453; NP_955400	NP_001156924; NP_062802
Location (UCSC)	Chr 20: 35 – 35.09 Mb	Chr 2: 155.48 – 155.53 Mb
PubMed search
- Wikidata
View/Edit Human	View/Edit Mouse

Trpc4-associated protein is a protein that in humans is encoded by the TRPC4AP gene.

== Interactions ==
TRPC4AP has been shown to interact with TNFRSF1A.

== See also ==
- TRPC
