= TDP1 =

Protein-coding gene in the species Homo sapiens

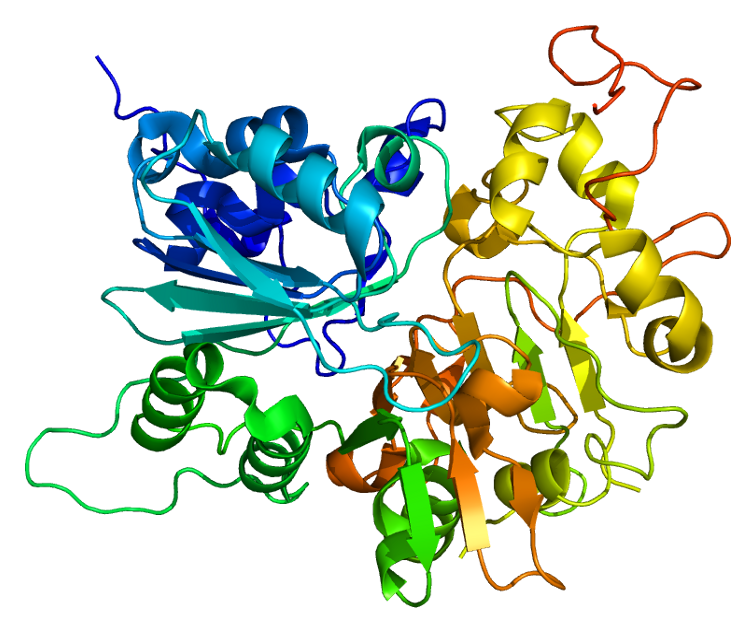

Identifiers
- Aliases: TDP1, tyrosyl-DNA phosphodiesterase 1
- External IDs: OMIM: 607198; MGI: 1920036; GeneCards: TDP1
Available structures
PDB	Ortholog search: PDBe RCSB
PDB	List of PDB id codes 1JY1, 1MU7, 1MU9, 1NOP, 1QZQ, 1RFF, 1RFI, 1RG1, 1RG2, 1RGT, 1RGU, 1RH0

Gene location (Human)
Chr.	Chromosome 14 (human)
Band	14q32.11	Start	89,954,939 bp
Band	14q32.11	End	90,044,768 bp

Gene location (Mouse)
Chr.	Chromosome 12 (mouse)
Band	12|12 E	Start	99,884,517 bp
Band	12|12 E	End	99,955,219 bp
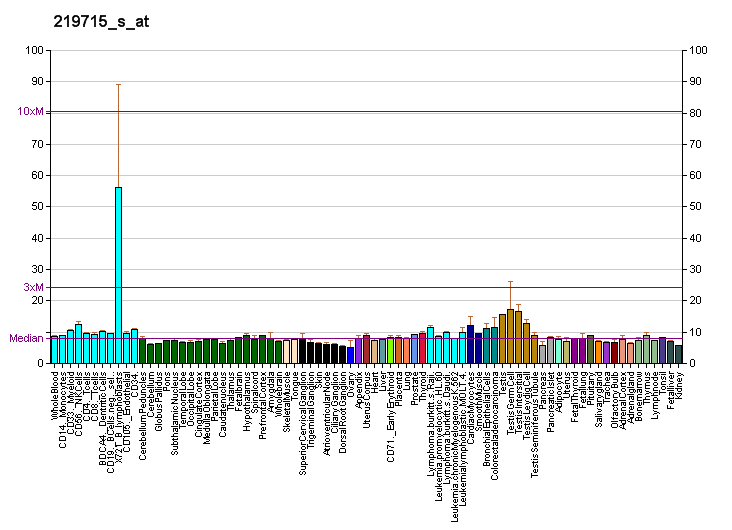
RNA expression pattern
Bgee	Human / Mouse (ortholog); Top expressed in: oocyte; secondary oocyte; right testis; left testis; testicle; ventricular zone; bone marrow cell; gonad; sperm; embryo / Top expressed in: seminiferous tubule; ventricular zone; yolk sac; secondary oocyte; epiblast; zygote; embryo; ganglionic eminence; tail of embryo; embryo; More reference expression data
BioGPS	More reference expression data
Gene ontology
Molecular function	phosphoric diester hydrolase activity; single-stranded DNA binding; nuclease activity; double-stranded DNA binding; 3'-tyrosyl-DNA phosphodiesterase activity; exonuclease activity; protein binding; hydrolase activity
Cellular component	cytoplasm; plasma membrane; intracellular membrane-bounded organelle; nucleus
Biological process	single strand break repair; double-strand break repair; DNA repair; nucleic acid phosphodiester bond hydrolysis; cellular response to DNA damage stimulus
Sources:Amigo / QuickGO
Orthologs
Databases	NCBI: entry; OMA: entry
Species	Human	Mouse
Entrez	55775	104884
Ensembl	ENSG00000042088	ENSMUSG00000021177
UniProt	Q9NUW8	Q8BJ37
RefSeq (mRNA)	NM_001008744; NM_018319; NM_001330205	NM_028354
RefSeq (protein)	NP_001008744; NP_001317134; NP_060789	n/a
Location (UCSC)	Chr 14: 89.95 – 90.04 Mb	Chr 12: 99.88 – 99.96 Mb
PubMed search
- Wikidata
View/Edit Human	View/Edit Mouse

Tyrosyl-DNA phosphodiesterase 1 is an enzyme that in humans is encoded by the TDP1 gene.

The protein encoded by this gene is involved in repairing stalled topoisomerase I-DNA complexes by catalyzing the hydrolysis of the phosphodiester bond between the tyrosine residue of Type I topoisomerase and the 3-prime phosphate of DNA. This protein may also remove glycolate from single-stranded DNA containing 3-prime phosphoglycolate, suggesting a role in repair of free-radical mediated DNA double-strand breaks.

This gene is a member of the phospholipase D family and contains two PLD phosphodiesterase domains. Mutations in this gene are associated with the disease spinocerebellar ataxia with axonal neuropathy (SCAN1). While several transcript variants may exist for this gene, the full-length natures of only two have been described to date. These two represent the major variants of this gene and encode the same isoform.

== See also ==
- Tyrosyl-DNA phosphodiesterase 2
