= Honor Fell =

British scientist and zoologist

Dame Honor Fell FRS, DBE
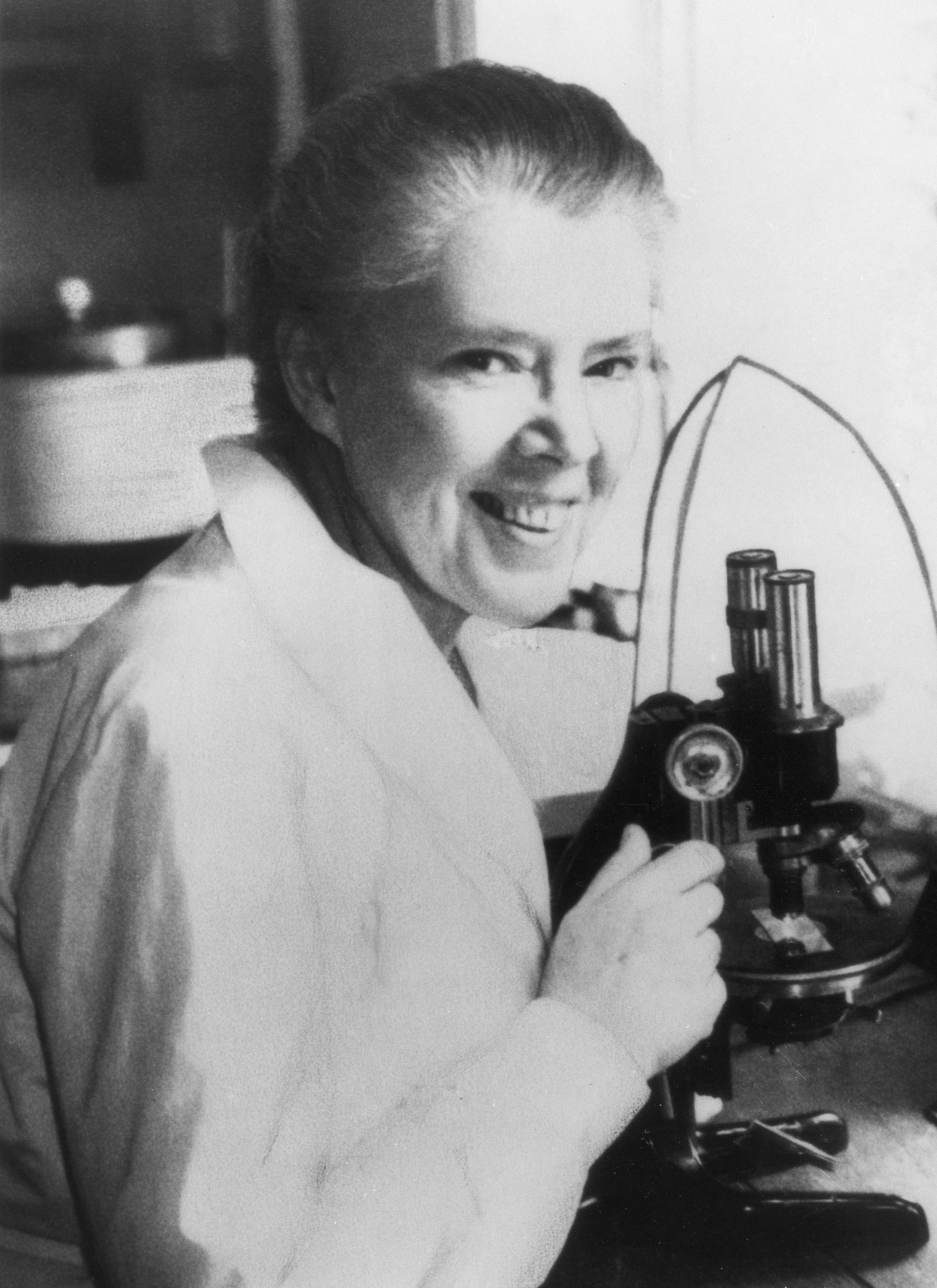
- Born: Honor Bridget Fell; 22 May 1900; Fowthorpe, near Filey, Yorkshire, England
- Died: 22 April 1986 (aged 85); Cambridge, England
- Education: University of Edinburgh
- Known for: Directing Strangeways Research Laboratory, developing tissue culture technique
- Awards: Grand Prix Charles-Leopold Mayer (French Academy of Sciences), honorary doctorates at several universities
- Scientific career
- Fields: Zoology, physiology, cell biology
- Workplaces: Strangeways Research Laboratory, University of Cambridge
- Thesis: Histological studies on the gonads of the fowl: the histological basis of sex reversal (1924)
- Academic advisors: Thomas Strangeways
- Notable students: Margaret Hurlstone Hardy Fallding

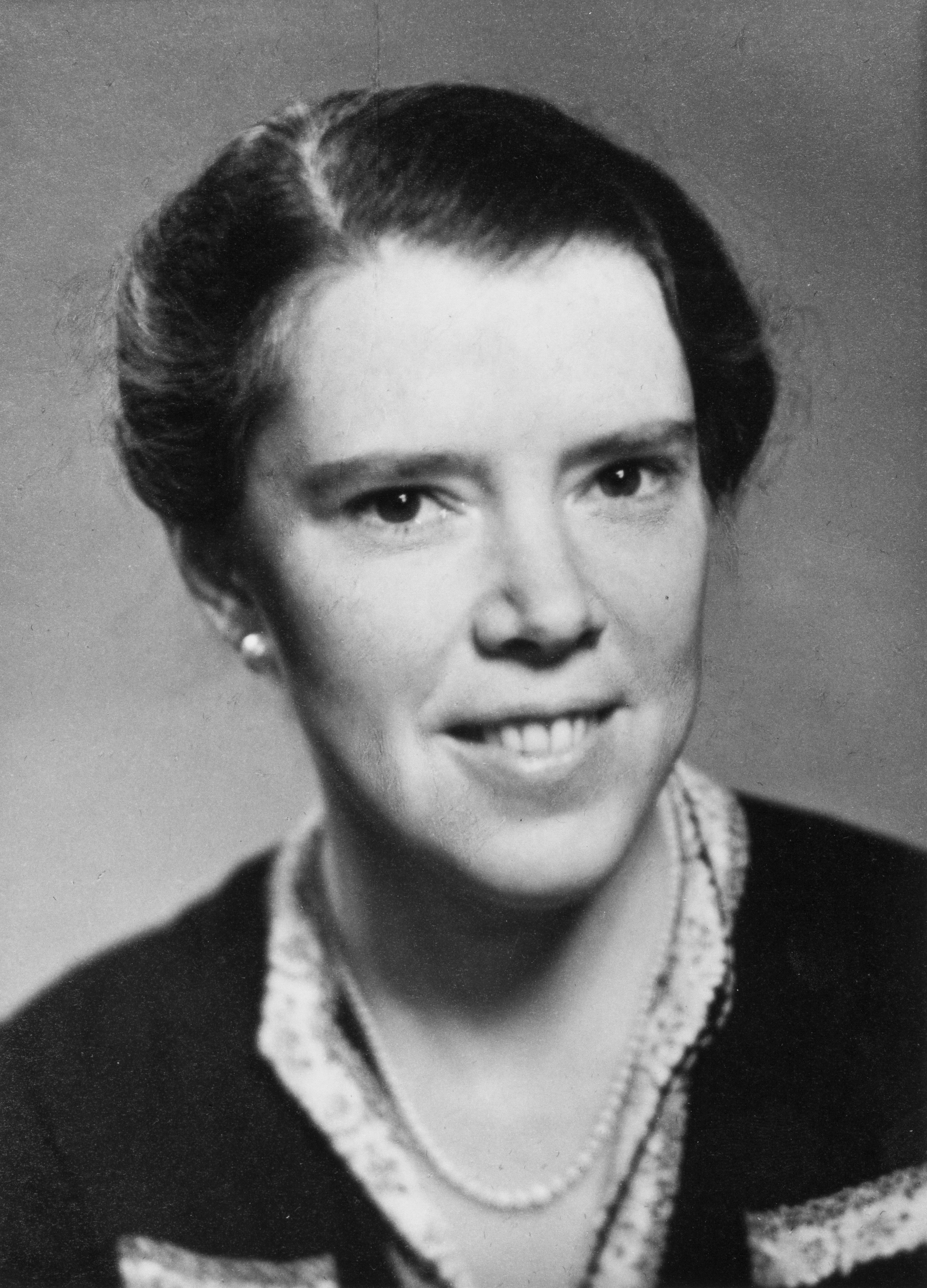
Fell as a young woman.

Dame Honor Bridget Fell, DBE, FRS (22 May 1900 – 22 April 1986) was a British scientist and zoologist. Her contributions to science included the development of experimental methods in organ culture, tissue culture, and cell biology.

== Early life and education ==
Fell was born to Colonel William Edwin Fell and Alice Fell at Fowthorpe near Filey in Yorkshire on 22 May 1900, the youngest of nine children. She had six sisters and two brothers, the younger of the two brothers, with down syndrome, died at the age of eight. Fell was known as the baby of the family. Her father was a minor landowner but cannot be said to have been a successful farmer. On the other hand her mother was a very practical and capable carpenter. Both school and family records highlight her childhood love of pet ferrets. Fell carried her pet ferret, Janie, to her sister Barbara's wedding when she was only thirteen. Fell had little contact with her family until the 1960s when one of her nephews, Henry Fell, and his wife asked her to stay with them. After that one visit she always spent Easter with them and sometimes Christmas.

She was educated at Wychwood School, North Oxford, and later at Madras College. In those days, Wychwood was considered rather advanced because of its emphasises on the importance of science, especially biology, as well as classics, history and literature. The school records refer to Honor Fell’s ferrets, which populated the garden. In 1916, she went to Madras College, St. Andrews. Later, in 1918, she began her undergraduate study in zoology at the University of Edinburgh, advised by Francis Albert Eley Crew. Crew recommended Fell as a summer researcher to Cambridge pathologist Thomas Strangeways, who was working in the then-new field of tissue culture. When Fell graduated in 1922 and found no open scientific positions in Edinburgh, she began work full-time as a research assistant to Strangeways. She earned a Ph.D. in 1924 entitled Histological studies on the gonads of the fowl and a D.Sc in 1932.

== Strangeways Research Laboratory ==
The Strangeways Research Laboratory, Cambridge, was an independent world-renowned research institution. Due to the lack of funds in 1908, it was forced to shut down, but reopened the following year. After Thomas Strangeways' unexpected death in 1926, the future of his research facility, then known as the Cambridge Research Hospital, was in doubt. After advocacy by Fell and collaborator F.G. Spear, the institution's trustees decided to keep the research group open, with funding from the Medical Research Council. Fell was named the new director in 1928 and the institution's name was changed to the Strangeways Research Laboratory in honor of its founder. A great reason to appoint Fell was she did not require salary. Fell was funded by the Beit Memorial Fellowship and supported by the Royal Society Research Fellowship. The researchers who worked at the laboratory were never funded by the funds from the research lab, which were obtained from different sources. Fell served as director until 1970 when she was succeeded by Michael Abercrombie. During that time, she also maintained an active research program in tissue and organ culture.

Although the laboratory was never well-funded—Fell described the funding situation at one point as "something of a nightmare"—it developed an international reputation for tissue culture, cell biology, and radiobiology, and attracted large numbers of visiting scientists; in one tabulation, visitors from 32 different countries were recorded. During the 1930s Fell took particular interest in finding positions for scientists arriving as refugees from continental Europe. As a rare example of a woman in senior scientific management of the time, Fell is also noted for supporting scientific careers for women at Strangeways, including Australian zoologist Margaret Hardy. Fell's skill in networking and administration is widely considered a major contributor to the success of the laboratory.

== Retirement ==
In retirement, Fell became a research worker in the Division of Immunology, Department of Pathology, at the University of Cambridge, in 1970 where she once again took up the immunobiology of rheumatoid disease. She returned to Strangeways in 1979 and remained there, still working in the laboratory, until shortly before her death in 1986.

== Tissue and organ culture methods ==
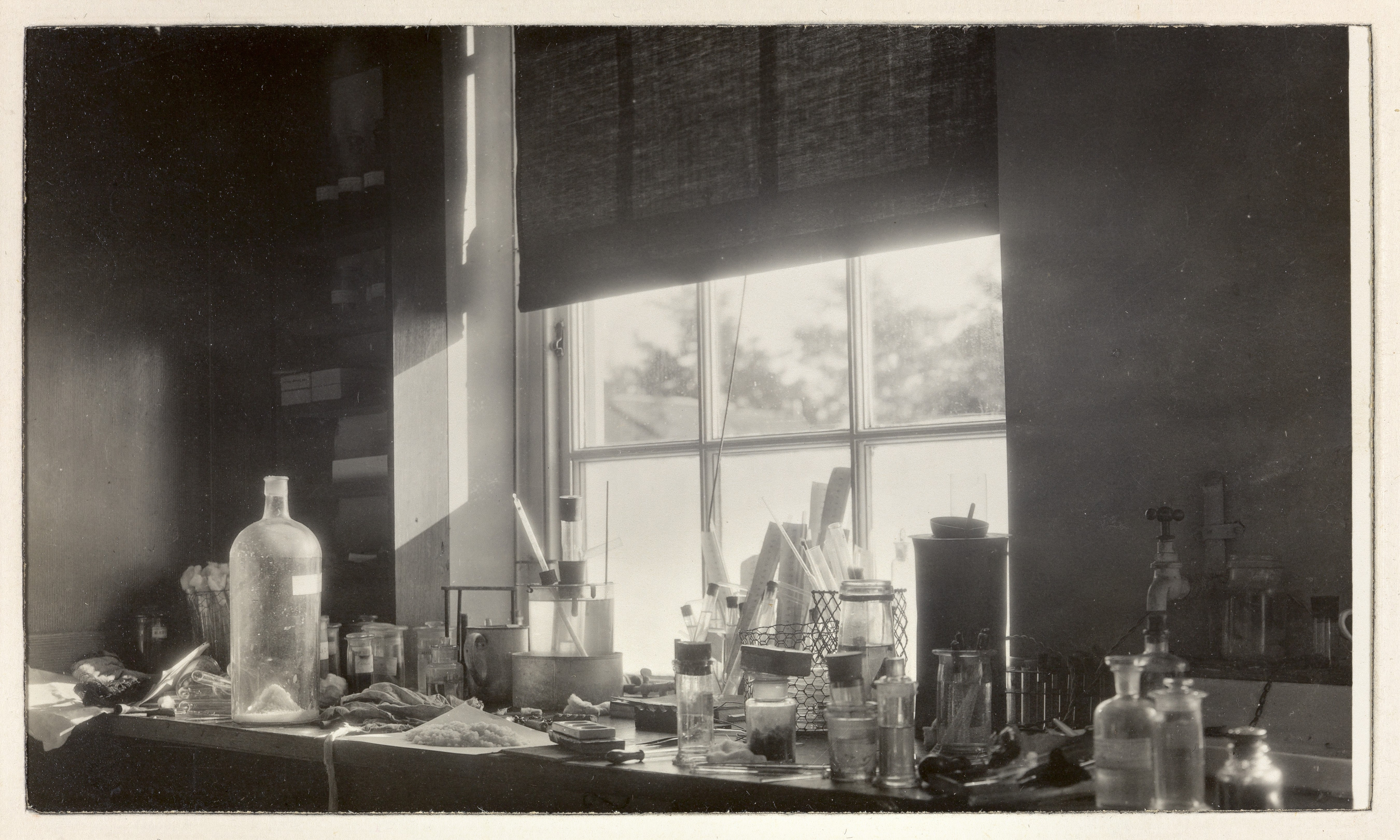
Fell's work area at Strangeways, ca. 1950.

Fell's career began during the early stages of the development of tissue culture as a method for working with living cells. Before Fell joined, this research was originally started by biologist Ross Harrison in 1907. In 1910, he started by performing small experiments. This enabled scientists to study living differentiated cells in environments that resembled the behaviour of organs in the animal body. The transition from histological examination of fixed, stained tissues to observation of living cells attracted great enthusiasm when the techniques were first developed, although their utility was somewhat controversial among scientists during the early days. The most remarkable and fundamental method on cell culture is cell hybridization. An organ culture is an excellent experimental system to study the responses of organized, functional cells to environmental factors. Tissue culture also attracted significant popular media interest, with contemporary reports describing Fell as a woman working on "cultivating life in bottles" and tissue culture as leading to the growth of human babies in test tubes. In time, cell culture or in vitro experiments have become a key pillar of life science research.

== Personal life ==
Fell lived alone during her working life and never married or had children. She first lived at lodgings and then lived in a house near the Laboratory for easier access. She entertained little, but loved to go on picnics with her friends into the Fenland countryside. She listed ‘Travel’ as her recreation in Who's Who but her travel, though extensive and all around the world, was for attending a conference to meet and work for a few weeks with fellow scientists or deliver an important lecture or receive a distinguished prize. She enjoyed travel for scientific events and conferences. Her skills at encouraging collaboration among scientists have been described as critical to the success of Strangeways during her directorship.

== Affiliations and awards ==
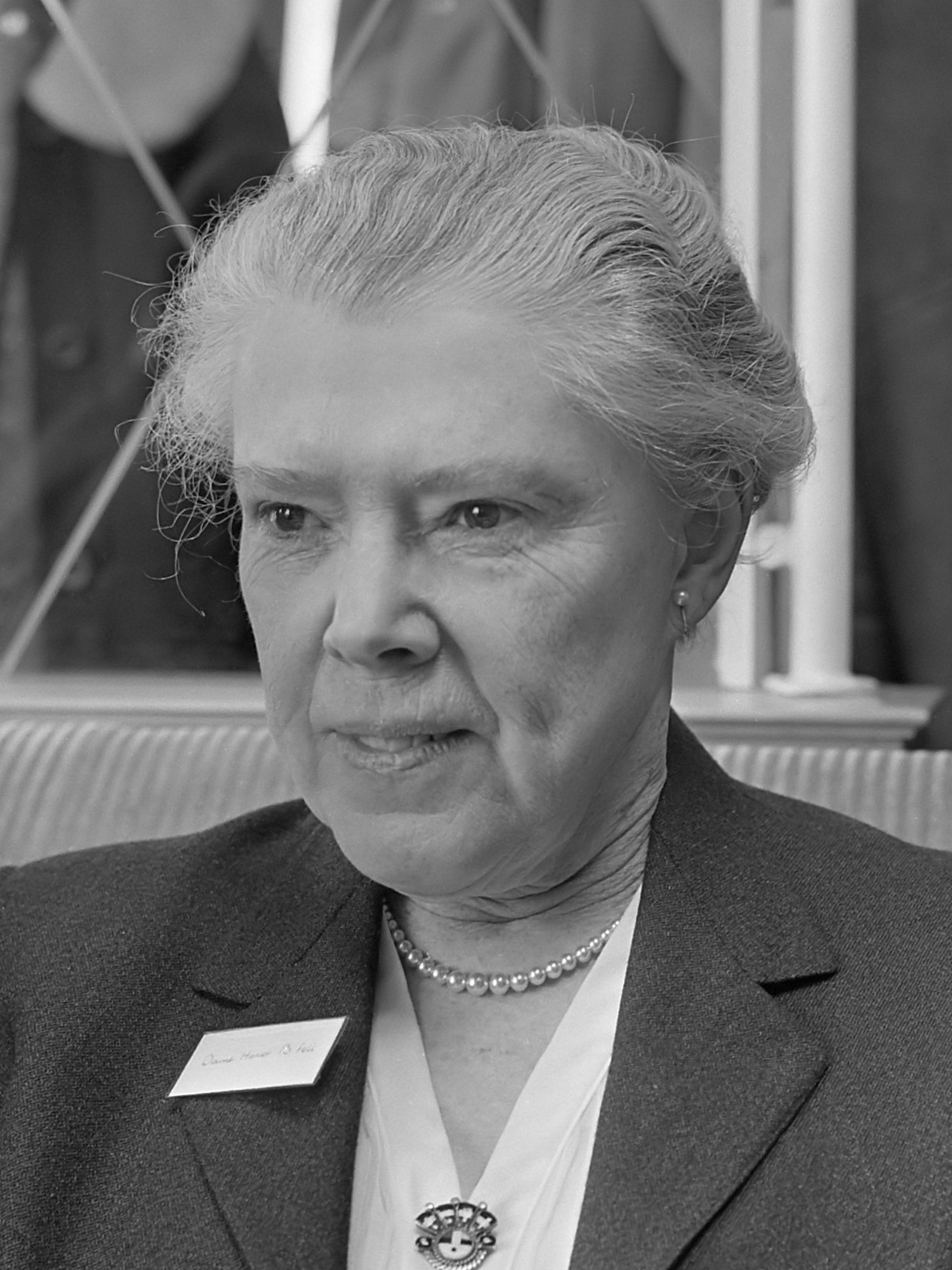
Honor Bridget Fell (1966)

- 1924: Junior Beit Fellow
- 1927: 4th-year Beit Fellow
- 1928: Senior Beit Fellow
- 1929–70: Director of the Strangeways Research Laboratory
- 1931–43: Messel Research Fellow Royal Society
- 1948 Trail Award and medal, Linnaeus Society
- 1943–67: Appointed Foulerton Research Fellow, Royal Society
- 1953: Elected Fellow, Royal Society of London
- 1955: Elected Fellow, Girton College, Cambridge University
- 1957: Elected Foreign Honorary Member, American Academy of Arts and Sciences
- 1959: Awarded Honorary LL.D, University of Edinburgh
- 1963: Awarded Dame Commander of the Order of the British Empire
- 1963: Appointed Royal Society Research Professor
- 1964: Awarded Honorary D.Sc, University of Oxford
- 1964: Awarded Honorary Sc.D, Harvard University
- 1965: Awarded the Grand Prix Charles-Leopold Mayer of the French Academy of Sciences
- 1975: Awarded Honorary MD, University of Leiden
- 1977: Appointed, Walker-Ames Professor, University of Washington, Seattle

== Sources ==
- Dame Honor Bridget Fell's personal papers archive is available for study at the Wellcome Collection, London (some of the material is digitised and digitally accessible via the website).
