= Strangeways Research Laboratory =

Research institution in Cambridge, United Kingdom

Coordinates: 52.1738°N 0.1497°E

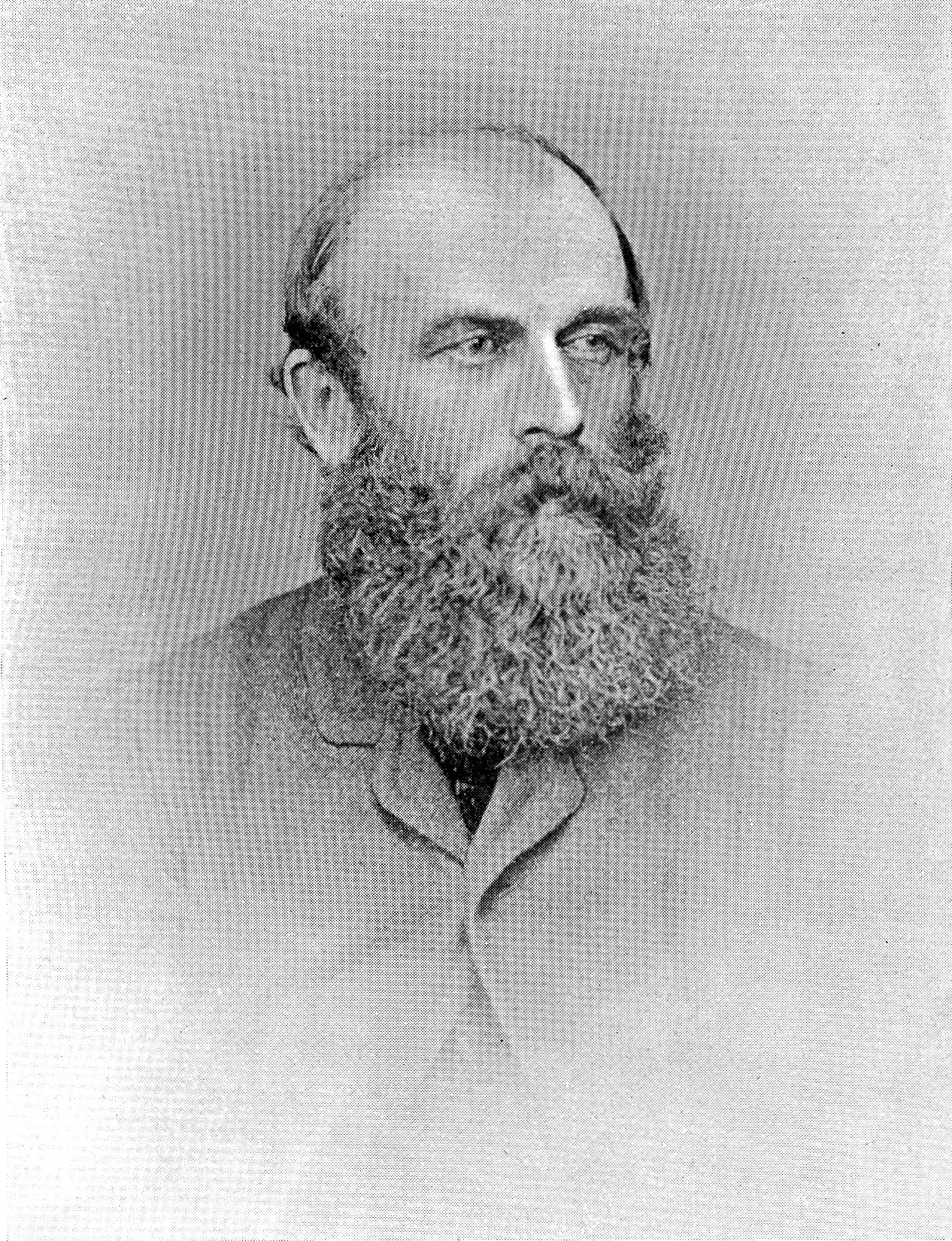
Thomas Strangeways, founder of the Strangeways Research Laboratory

Strangeways Research Laboratory is a research institution in Cambridge, United Kingdom. It was founded by Thomas Strangeways in 1905 as the Cambridge Research Hospital and acquired its current name in 1928. Organised as an independent charity, it was historically funded primarily by the Medical Research Council and is currently managed by the University of Cambridge, also its sole trustee. Formerly a site of research on rheumatic arthritis and connective tissue disorders, it has since 1997 focused on the study of genetic epidemiology.

== History ==
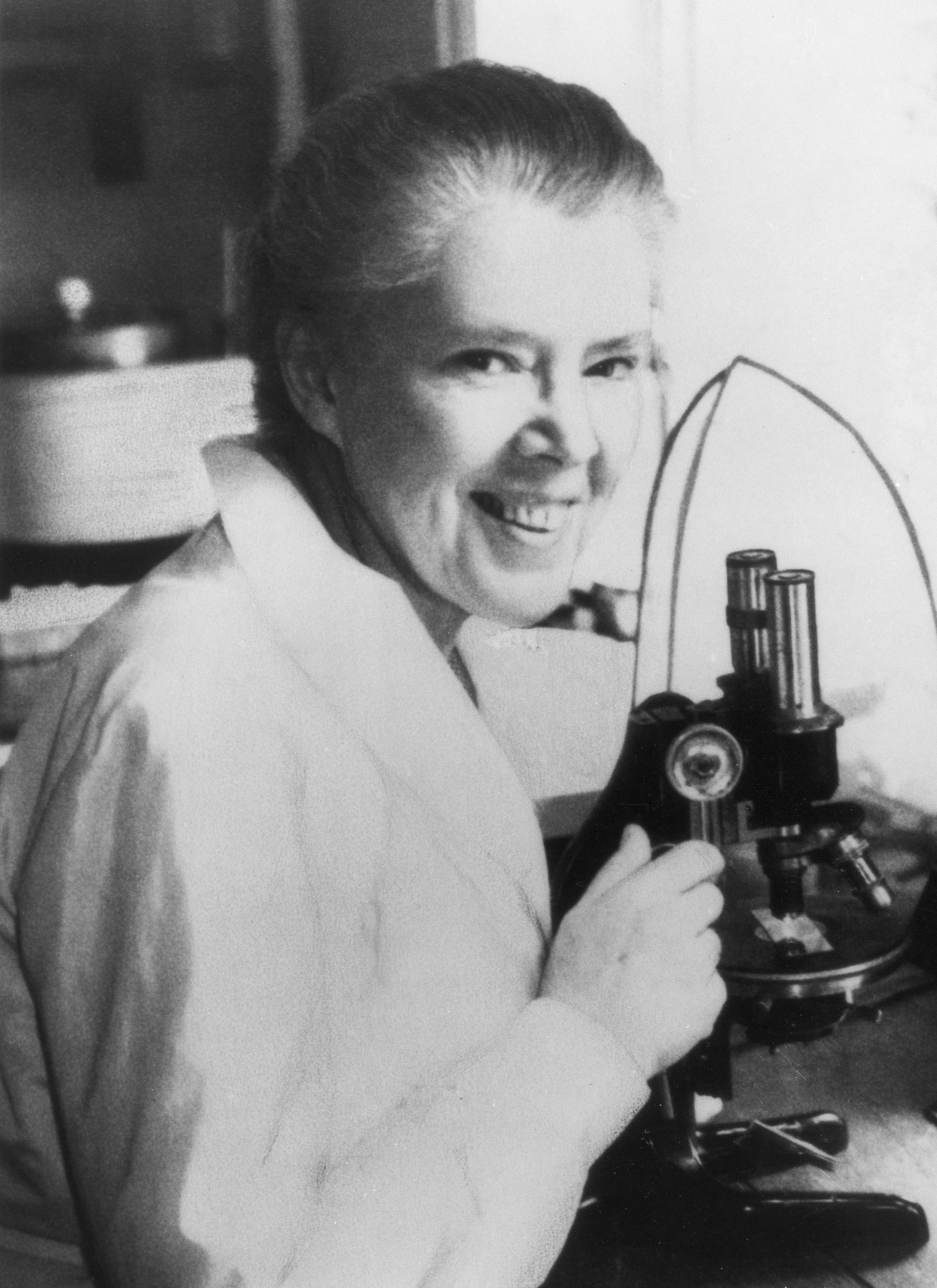
Honor Fell working at a microscope

The institution was founded in 1905 as the Cambridge Research Hospital by physician Thomas Strangeways, who sought to study patients suffering from rheumatoid arthritis and related conditions. Funded by a combination of Strangeways' own contributions, support from noted doctors of the time, and donations from patients, the hospital began modestly with only six beds, and with research equipment located in renovated coal sheds. It closed briefly in 1908 due to lack of funding, but quickly reopened and moved to its current site in 1912 thanks to the support of Otto Beit. It was temporarily repurposed as a hospital for military officers in World War I but returned to use as a research site in 1917. Subsequently, in 1923, Strangeways moved the clinical aspects of his work to St Bartholomew's Hospital in order to focus research efforts at the laboratory on then-emerging technologies in tissue culture and cell biology.

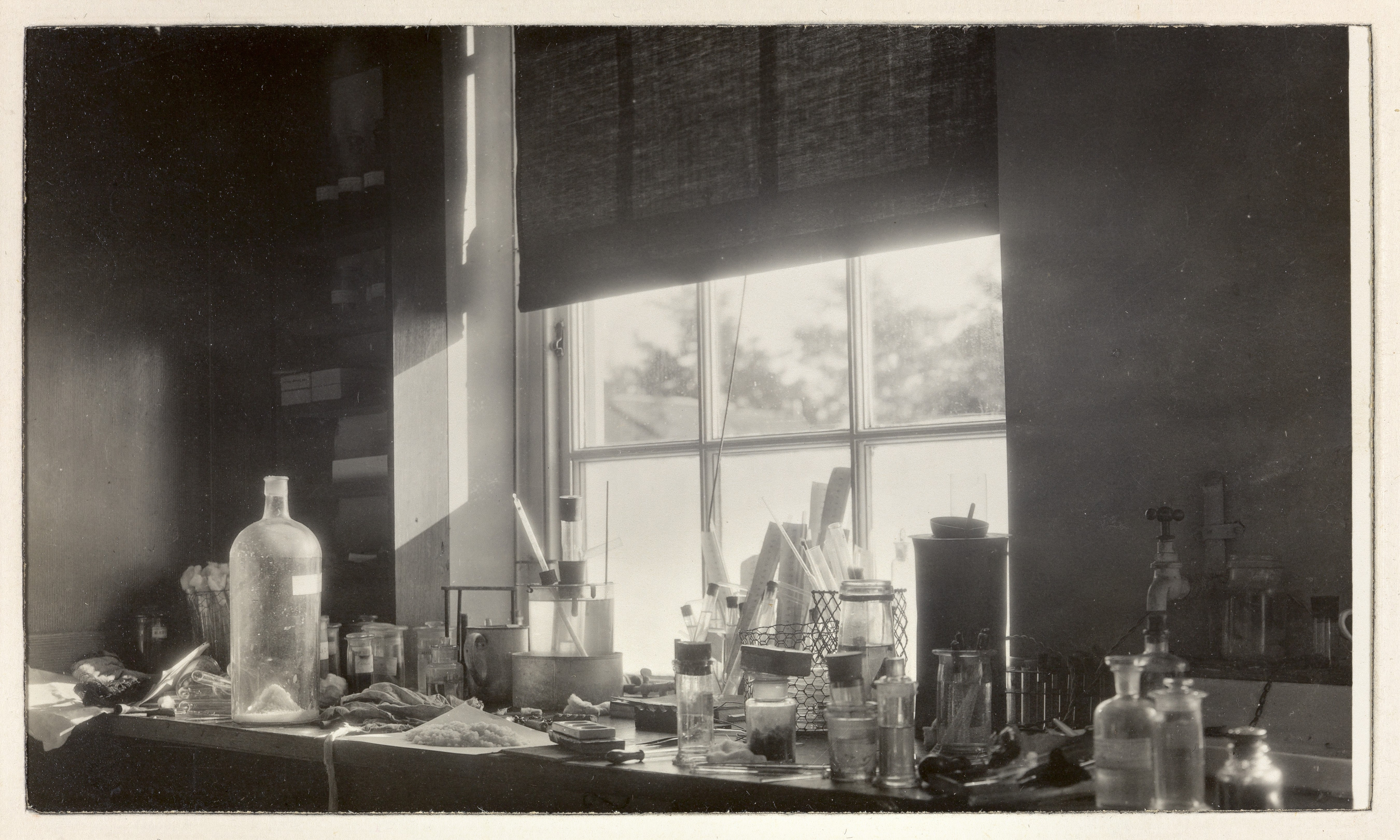
Honor Fell's work area at Strangeways, ca. 1950

Following Strangeways' death in 1926, the laboratory's future and finances were in doubt; advocates of keeping the laboratory open included F.G. Spear and Strangeways' protege Honor Fell, a scientist employed there at the time of Strangeways' death. Funding was obtained largely from the Medical Research Council and the name was changed to Strangeways Research Laboratory in honour of its founder. Fell became the new director of the laboratory and served in that position from 1928 to 1970, while also maintaining an active research program in tissue and organ culture throughout her directorship. Fell was succeeded as director by Michael Abercrombie in 1970, but returned to Strangeways as a scientist in 1979 and continued work until shortly before her death in 1986. A rare example of a woman in a senior management position at the time, Fell is noted for her work supporting scientific careers for women at Strangeways during her tenure as director.

The laboratory was never well-funded, and Fell described the funding situation as "something of a nightmare". Nevertheless, it developed a reputation for excellence in the fields of cell biology, tissue culture, and radiobiology that attracted a wide range of visiting scientists. In the 1930s, the laboratory described itself as a center for development of tissue culture work and of basic research with potential applications to human medicine. The laboratory hosted the first scientific research position held by Francis Crick, who performed part-time research in the late 1940s, supported by Fell.

== Present ==
In 1997 the laboratory was restructured, shifting research focus to genetic epidemiology. It is currently managed by the Department of Public Health and Primary Care at the University of Cambridge under the directorship of epidemiologist John Danesh.

== Directors ==
Directors of the Strangeways Research Laboratory have included:

- Thomas Strangeways: 1905–1926
- Honor Fell: 1928–1970
- Michael Abercrombie: 1970–1979
- John T. Dingle: 1979–1993
- Nick Day (co-director): 1997–2004
- Bruce Ponder (co-director): 1997–2010
- John Danesh (co-director): 2004–2010, (director): current
