= Odyneromyia iridescens =

Scientific classification
- Kingdom: Animalia
- Phylum: Arthropoda
- Clade: Pancrustacea
- Class: Insecta
- Order: Diptera
- Family: Syrphidae
- Subfamily: Eristalinae
- Tribe: Milesiini
- Subtribe: Temnostomina
- Genus: Odyneromyia
- Species: O. iridescens

Binomial name
- Odyneromyia iridescens (Ferguson, 1926)

Synonyms
- Xylota iridescens Ferguson, 1926

Species of fly

Odyneromyia iridescens, or the white-spotted red hoverfly, is a species of hoverfly in the family Syrphidae.

== Distribution ==
The known distribution is between Brisbane in Queensland and the south coast of New South Wales.
