= Thomas Strangeways =

British pathologist (1866–1926)

Thomas Strangeways Pigg Strangeways
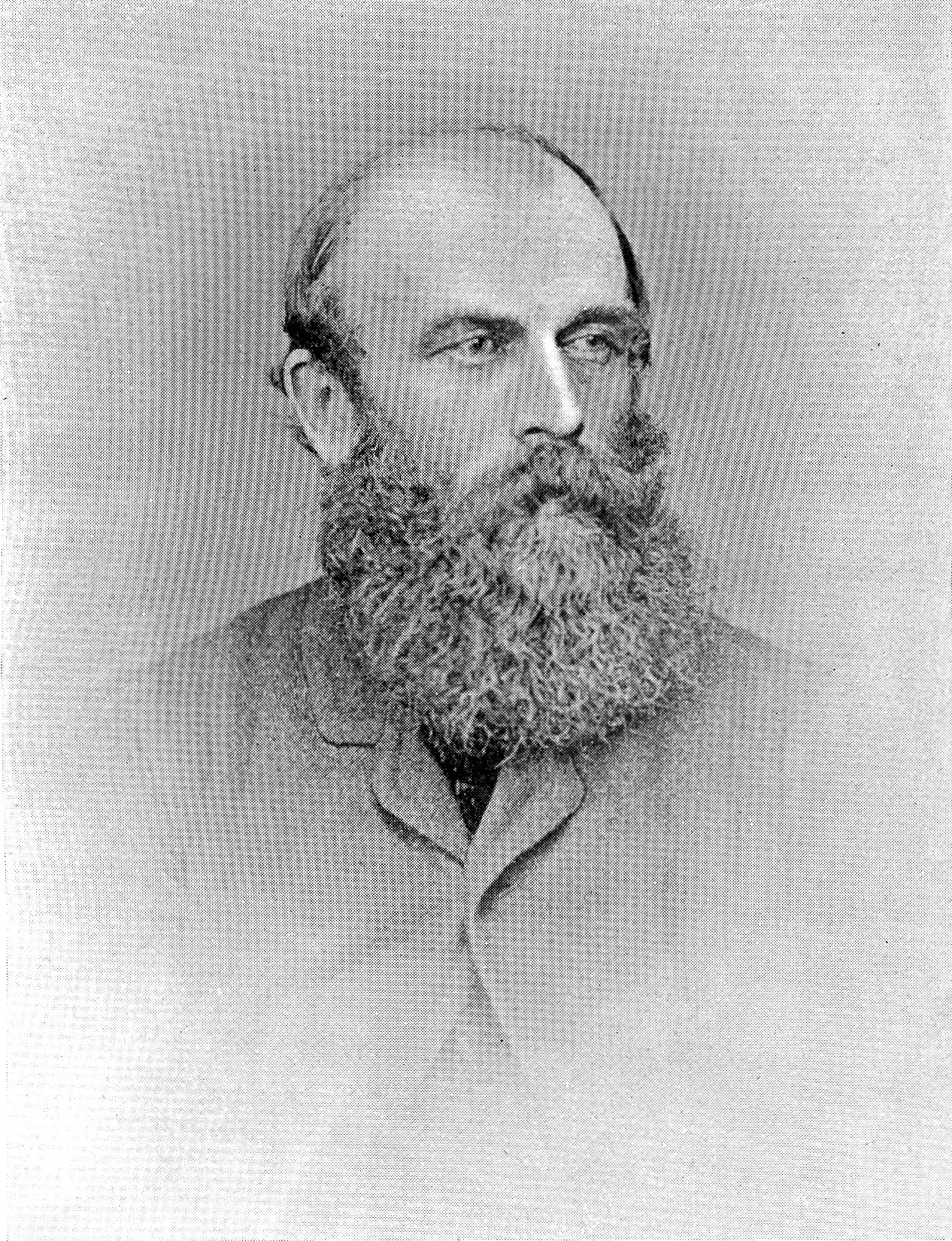
- Born: 1866
- Died: 1926 (aged 59–60)
- Known for: Founding the Strangeways Research Laboratory; developing tissue culture techniques
- Scientific career
- Fields: Pathology, cell biology
- Academic advisors: Alfredo Kanthack
- Notable students: Honor Fell

Thomas Strangeways Pigg Strangeways (1866–1926) was a British pathologist, known for founding the Cambridge Research Hospital, which was renamed the Strangeways Research Laboratory following Strangeways' death in 1926.

== Education and early career ==
Strangeways was born Thomas Strangeways Pigg in 1866. Strangeways studied under Alfredo Kanthack at St Bartholomew's Hospital and received his medical degree in 1890. He followed Kanthack to the University of Cambridge after Kanthack was offered the chair of the Pathology Department there. Strangeways became a demonstrator and subsequently a lecturer in pathology at the University of Cambridge.

== Founding of Cambridge Research Hospital ==
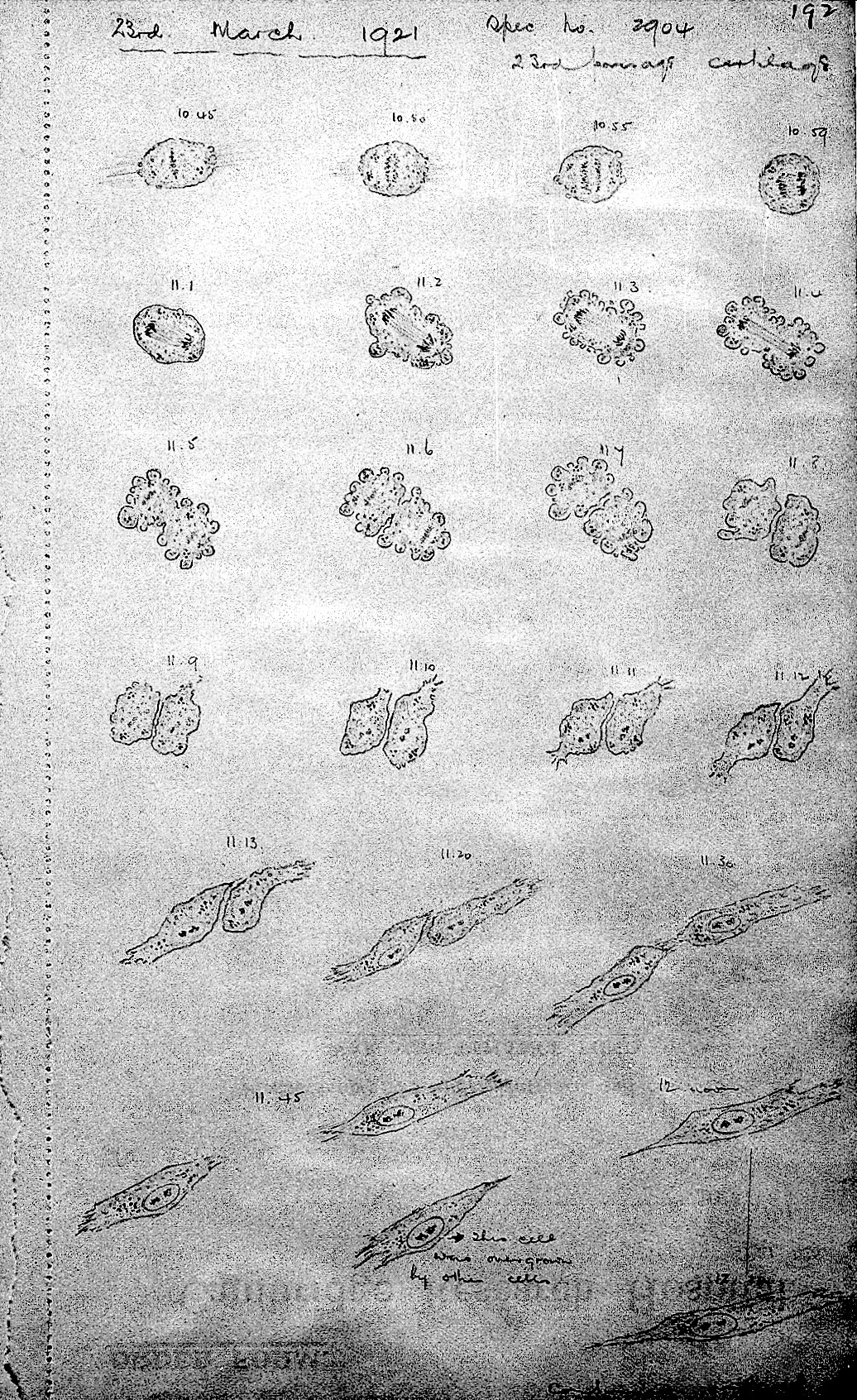
A page of notes from a Research Hospital notebook dated 1921, believed to have been written by Strangeways.

Strangeways developed an interest in the pathology of rheumatoid arthritis and in 1905 founded the Cambridge Research Hospital in order to study patients with this condition and related ones. Funded largely by Strangeways himself, noted doctors of his acquaintance, and donations from patients, the hospital began modestly with only six beds, and with research equipment located in renovated coal sheds. It closed briefly in 1908 due to lack of funding, but quickly reopened and moved to its current site in 1912 thanks to the support of Otto Beit and to its temporary repurposing as a hospital for military officers in World War I. The hospital returned to its research purpose in 1917. Later, in 1923, the clinical aspects of the laboratory's work were moved back to St Bartholomew's Hospital so that the laboratory could focus on then-newly developing technologies in tissue culture and cell biology. Having learned about tissue culture techniques from Alexis Carrel, Strangeways took great interest in the new field, including developing demonstrations of the technique for his lectures. After University of Edinburgh zoology student Honor Fell spent a summer working with him, he hired her as a research assistant; she would take over leadership of the laboratory following Strangeways' death in 1926. In the 1920s and 30s, the laboratory was the only British institution focused specifically on tissue culture technique, the utility of which was a controversial topic among scientists of the time.

== Personal life ==
Strangeways became engaged to Dorothy Beck in 1901 and the couple married in 1902. As of the construction of the new hospital building in 1912, they had two children. Strangeways financed his laboratory out of his own earnings for most of his life, although he was not personally wealthy; a later director of the laboratory, John Dingle, wrote in a retrospective that "there is little doubt that his family suffered financially" from his investments, although Dorothy was consistently supportive of the project. Strangeways died unexpectedly of a brain haemorrhage in 1926. At the age of 60.

== See also ==
- David Strangeways
