= The FASEB Journal =

- Discipline: Biology
- Language: English
- Edited by: Loren E. Wold, PhD

Publication details
- Former name: Federation Proceedings
- History: 1912–present
- Publisher: Federation of American Societies for Experimental Biology (Monthly)
- Impact factor: 4.4 (2023)

Standard abbreviations
- ISO 4: FASEB J.

Indexing
- ISSN: 0892-6638 (print); 1530-6860 (web)
- LCCN: 87644294
- OCLC no.: 1096896944

Links
- Journal homepage; Archives

The FASEB Journal is a peer-reviewed scientific journal related to experimental biology. The journal was established in 1987 and has been published since 2020 by Wiley on behalf of the Federation of American Societies for Experimental Biology.

It is published monthly and contains special collections throughout the year. The journal publishes research in the biological and biomedical sciences as well as interdisciplinary research cutting across multiple fields and areas. The FASEB Journal offers both a subscription model and open access.

== Ranking ==
According to the Journal Citation Reports, the journal has a 2023 impact factor of 4.4.

== Past FJ Editors-In Chief ==
- Thoru Pederson, PhD (2016–2022)
- Gerald Weissmann, PhD (2006–2015)
- Vincent Marchesi, PhD (1996–2005)
- William J. Whelan, PhD (1986–1996)
