= Odyneromyia transparens =

Scientific classification
- Kingdom: Animalia
- Phylum: Arthropoda
- Clade: Pancrustacea
- Class: Insecta
- Order: Diptera
- Family: Syrphidae
- Subfamily: Eristalinae
- Tribe: Milesiini
- Subtribe: Temnostomina
- Genus: Odyneromyia
- Species: O. transparens

Binomial name
- Odyneromyia transparens (Paramonov, 1955)

Synonyms
- Criorrhina transparens Paramonov, 1955

Species of fly

Odyneromyia transparens is a species of hoverfly in the family Syrphidae.

== Distribution ==
Australia.
