= John Danesh =

Public health doctor

John Danesh is a Professor of Epidemiology and Medicine and the head of the Department of Public Health and Primary Care at the University of Cambridge. He also holds several other leadership roles in scientific organizations, including director of the department's affiliate Strangeways Research Laboratory and founder and director of the Cardiovascular Epidemiology Unit. He is also an associate faculty member at the Wellcome Trust Sanger Institute and an honorary consultant at the Cambridge University Hospitals NHS Foundation Trust. He became a fellow of the Royal College of Physicians in 2007 and of the Academy of Medical Sciences in 2015.

Professor Danesh has been the British Heart Foundation Professor of Medicine and Epidemiology since 2012. In 2013 he won the Senior Investigator award from the National Institute for Health and Care Research (NIHR).

== Education ==
Danesh was educated in New Zealand and Australia, studying medicine at the University of Otago in and the Royal Melbourne Hospital. He was a Rhodes scholar (awarded 1992) who earned an MSc from the London School of Hygiene and Tropical Medicine and a DPhil from the University of Oxford, both in epidemiology.

== Research ==
Danesh's interest is in the genetic epidemiology of cardiovascular disease. He has conducted large-scale genetic studies of heart disease risk across multinational populations and his work has often been cited in guidelines for clinical practice. Among his most widely cited research results is the observation that C-reactive protein is only moderately predictive of coronary heart disease.
