= Odyneromyia illucens =

Scientific classification
- Kingdom: Animalia
- Phylum: Arthropoda
- Clade: Pancrustacea
- Class: Insecta
- Order: Diptera
- Family: Syrphidae
- Subfamily: Eristalinae
- Tribe: Milesiini
- Subtribe: Temnostomina
- Genus: Odyneromyia
- Species: O. illucens

Binomial name
- Odyneromyia illucens (Ferguson, 1926)

Synonyms
- Xylota illucens Ferguson, 1926; Criorrhina soror (Paramonov, 1955)

Species of fly

Odyneromyia illucens is a species of hoverfly in the family Syrphidae.

== Distribution ==
Australia.
