= Tyrosyl-DNA phosphodiesterase 2 =

Enzyme found in humans

TDP2

Identifiers
- Aliases: TDP2, AD022, EAP2, EAPII, TTRAP, dJ30M3.3, htyrosyl-DNA phosphodiesterase 2
- External IDs: OMIM: 605764; MGI: 1860486; GeneCards: TDP2
Available structures
PDB	Ortholog search: PDBe RCSB
PDB	List of PDB id codes 5J3S, 5INO, 5J3P

Gene location (Human)
Chr.	Chromosome 6 (human)
Band	6p22.3	Start	24,649,979 bp
Band	6p22.3	End	24,666,930 bp

Gene location (Mouse)
Chr.	Chromosome 13 (mouse)
Band	13 A3.1|13 10.7 cM	Start	25,015,662 bp
Band	13 A3.1|13 10.7 cM	End	25,026,136 bp
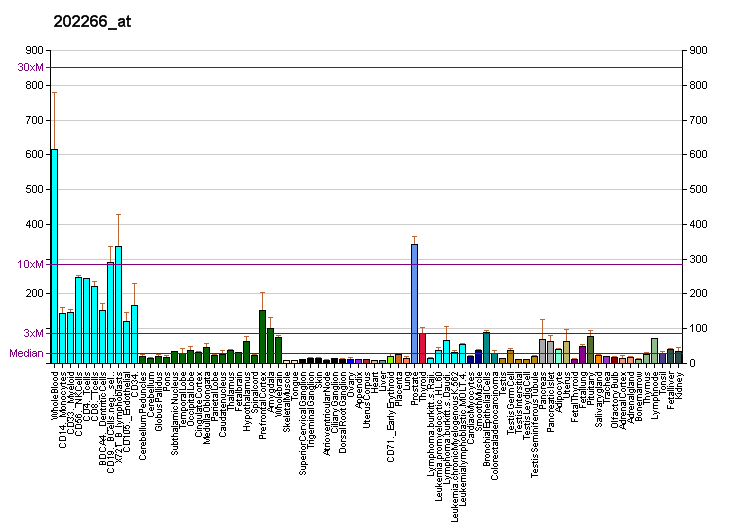
RNA expression pattern
Bgee	Human / Mouse (ortholog); Top expressed in: jejunal mucosa; mucosa of sigmoid colon; mucosa of ileum; rectum; duodenum; mucosa of transverse colon; gonad; palpebral conjunctiva; kidney tubule; islet of Langerhans / Top expressed in: otic placode; saccule; otic vesicle; primitive streak; tail of embryo; abdominal wall; atrioventricular valve; epiblast; ciliary body; maxillary prominence; More reference expression data
BioGPS	More reference expression data
Gene ontology
Molecular function	metal ion binding; single-stranded DNA binding; nuclease activity; protein binding; 5'-tyrosyl-DNA phosphodiesterase activity; manganese ion binding; transcription corepressor activity; magnesium ion binding; tyrosyl-RNA phosphodiesterase activity; hydrolase activity
Cellular component	cytoplasm; PML body; nucleolus; nucleus; nucleoplasm; aggresome; nuclear body
Biological process	cell surface receptor signaling pathway; double-strand break repair; DNA repair; nucleic acid phosphodiester bond hydrolysis; cellular response to DNA damage stimulus; negative regulation of nucleic acid-templated transcription; neuron development
Sources:Amigo / QuickGO
Orthologs
Databases	NCBI: entry; OMA: entry
Species	Human	Mouse
Entrez	51567	56196
Ensembl	ENSG00000111802	ENSMUSG00000035958
UniProt	O95551	Q9JJX7
RefSeq (mRNA)	NM_016614	NM_019551
RefSeq (protein)	NP_057698	NP_062424
Location (UCSC)	Chr 6: 24.65 – 24.67 Mb	Chr 13: 25.02 – 25.03 Mb
PubMed search
- Wikidata
View/Edit Human	View/Edit Mouse

Tyrosyl-DNA phosphodiesterase 2 is an enzyme that in humans is encoded by the gene TDP2 (previously TTRAP). The TDP2 protein functions as a DNA repair enzyme by removing covalent adducts from DNA. It functions in a similar role to the TDP1 enzyme, but it preferentially acts on 5'-phosphodiester bonds, while TDP1 is the faster and more efficient enzyme for 3'-phosphodiester bonds.

This protein is a member of a superfamily of divalent cation-dependent phosphodiesterases. It associates with CD40, tumor necrosis factor (TNF) receptor-75 and TNF receptor associated factors (TRAFs), and inhibits nuclear factor-kappa-B activation. This protein has sequence and structural similarities with APE1 endonuclease, which is involved in both DNA repair and the activation of transcription factors.

== Interactions ==
TTRAP has been shown to interact with ETS1, TNFRSF1B and CD40.
