= Immunologic activation =

Transition of leucocytes in immune system

In immunology, activation is the transition of leucocytes and other cell types involved in the immune system. On the other hand, deactivation is the transition in the reverse direction. This balance is tightly regulated, since a too small degree of activation causes susceptibility to infections, while, on the other hand, a too large degree of activation causes autoimmune diseases.

== Factors ==
Activation and deactivation results from a variety of factors, including cytokines, soluble receptors, arachidonic acid metabolites, steroids, receptor antagonists, adhesion molecules, bacterial products and viral products.

Overview of activating and deactivating factors.
	Activation	Deactivation
Cytokines	IFN-γ; GM-CSF; M-CSF; IL-6; TNF-α; MIF; CCL2	IL-4; IL-10; IL-13; TGF-β
Soluble receptors		sIL-1R; sIL-6R; sTNFR; sCD14
Arachidonic acid metabolites	PGE2; LTB4	
Steroids		Corticosteroids
Receptor antagonists		IL-1Ra
Adhesion molecules	β2-integrins; Fc receptors; CD14; P-selectin; CD45	
Bacterial products	LPS; fMetLeuPhe	
Viral products	dsRNA	BCRF1 (IL-10-homologue); T2 (sTNFR-homologue); M-T7 (sINF-γR-homologue)

== See also ==
- Immune system
