= Odyneromyia valdiviformis =

Scientific classification
- Kingdom: Animalia
- Phylum: Arthropoda
- Class: Insecta
- Order: Diptera
- Family: Syrphidae
- Subfamily: Eristalinae
- Tribe: Milesiini
- Subtribe: Temnostomina
- Genus: Odyneromyia
- Species: O. valdiviformis

Binomial name
- Odyneromyia valdiviformis Shannon & Aubertin, 1933

Species of fly

Odyneromyia valdiviformis is a species of hoverfly in the family Syrphidae.

== Distribution ==
Argentina.
