= Odyneromyia odyneroides =

Scientific classification
- Kingdom: Animalia
- Phylum: Arthropoda
- Class: Insecta
- Order: Diptera
- Family: Syrphidae
- Subfamily: Eristalinae
- Tribe: Milesiini
- Subtribe: Temnostomina
- Genus: Odyneromyia
- Species: O. odyneroides

Binomial name
- Odyneromyia odyneroides (Philippi, 1865)

Synonyms
- Doros odyneroides Philippi, 1865

Species of fly

Odyneromyia odyneroides is a species of hoverfly in the family Syrphidae.

== Distribution ==
Chile.
