= ETS1 =

Protein-coding gene in the species Homo sapiens

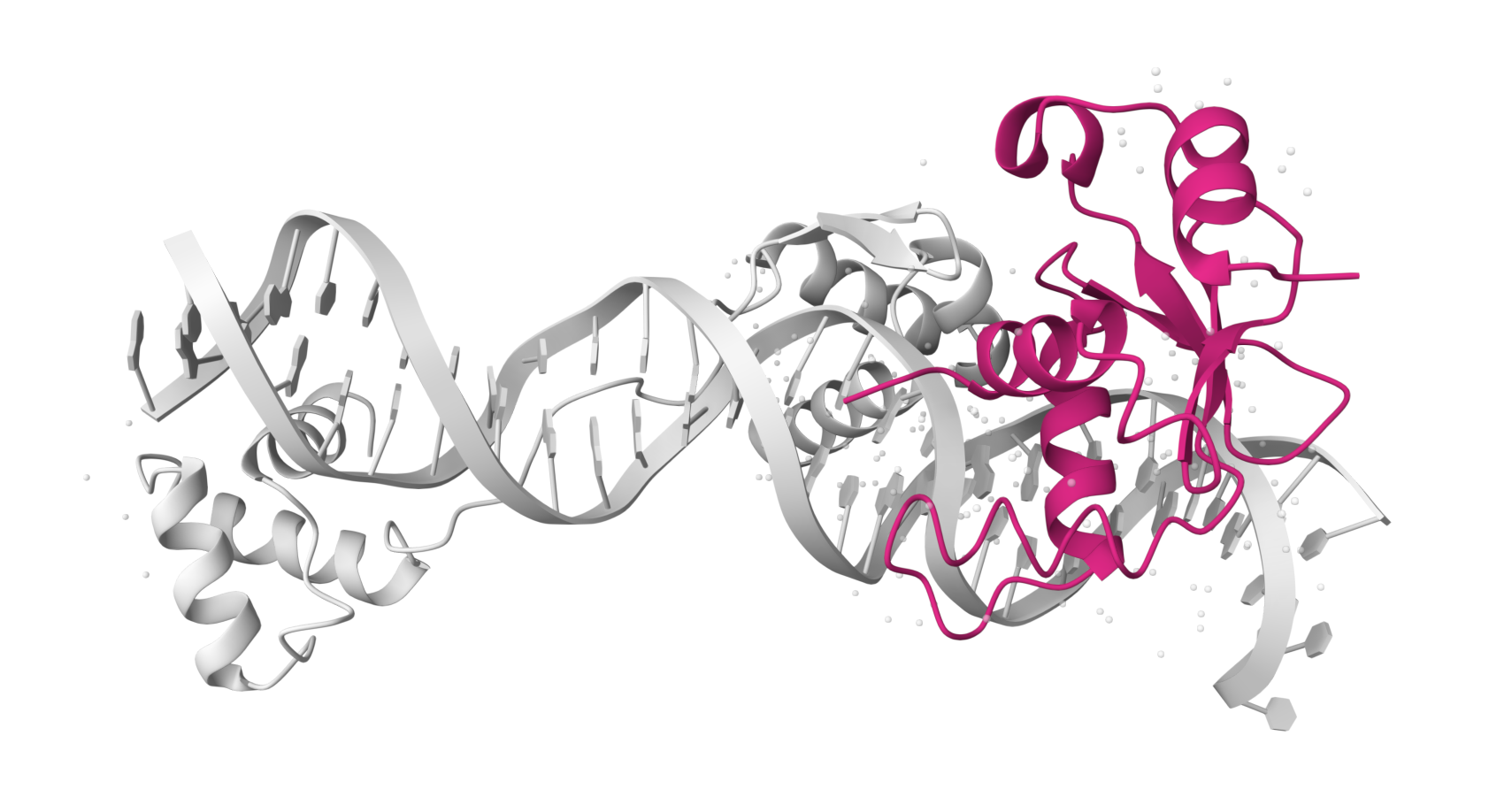

Identifiers
- Aliases: ETS1, ETS-1, EWSR2, p54, c-ets-1, ETS proto-oncogene 1, transcription factor
- External IDs: OMIM: 164720; MGI: 95455; GeneCards: ETS1
Available structures
PDB	Ortholog search: PDBe RCSB
PDB	List of PDB id codes 1GVJ, 2NNY, 2STT, 2STW, 3MFK, 3RI4, 3WTS, 3WTT, 3WTU, 3WTV, 3WTW, 3WTX, 3WTY, 3WTZ, 3WU0, 3WU1, 4L0Y, 4L0Z, 4L18, 4LG0

Gene location (Human)
Chr.	Chromosome 11 (human)
Band	11q24.3	Start	128,458,761 bp
Band	11q24.3	End	128,587,558 bp

Gene location (Mouse)
Chr.	Chromosome 9 (mouse)
Band	9 A4|9 17.97 cM	Start	32,636,221 bp
Band	9 A4|9 17.97 cM	End	32,757,820 bp
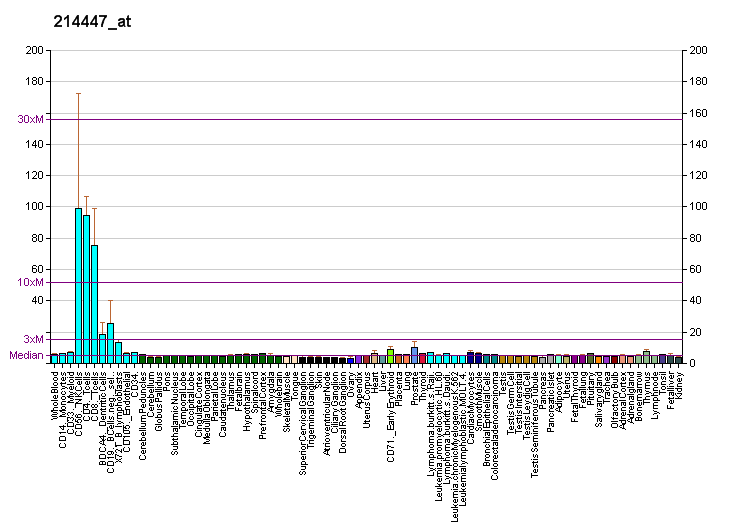
RNA expression pattern
Bgee	Human / Mouse (ortholog); Top expressed in: visceral pleura; parietal pleura; tibia; epithelium of nasopharynx; lower lobe of lung; superficial temporal artery; epithelium of colon; pericardium; vena cava; lymph node / Top expressed in: left lung lobe; thymus; mesenteric lymph nodes; blood; spleen; Gonadal ridge; right lung lobe; atrium; atrioventricular valve; endocardial cushion; More reference expression data
BioGPS	More reference expression data
Gene ontology
Molecular function	DNA binding; sequence-specific DNA binding; DNA-binding transcription factor activity; transcription factor binding; protein binding; identical protein binding; transcription factor activity, RNA polymerase II core promoter proximal region sequence-specific binding; RNA polymerase II cis-regulatory region sequence-specific DNA binding; DNA-binding transcription activator activity, RNA polymerase II-specific; sequence-specific double-stranded DNA binding; DNA-binding transcription factor activity, RNA polymerase II-specific; histone acetyltransferase binding
Cellular component	cytoplasm; transcription regulator complex; nucleoplasm; nucleus
Biological process	regulation of apoptotic process; pituitary gland development; response to estradiol; response to interleukin-1; response to hypoxia; regulation of transcription, DNA-templated; positive regulation of erythrocyte differentiation; cell motility; estrous cycle; immune system process; regulation of transcription by RNA polymerase II; response to antibiotic; female pregnancy; angiogenesis involved in wound healing; positive regulation of cell migration; response to mechanical stimulus; response to laminar fluid shear stress; negative regulation of cell cycle; regulation of angiogenesis; transcription by RNA polymerase II; regulation of extracellular matrix disassembly; transcription, DNA-templated; positive regulation of endothelial cell migration; positive regulation of transcription, DNA-templated; PML body organization; response to wounding; immune response; positive regulation of cell population proliferation; hypothalamus development; negative regulation of inflammatory response; positive regulation of transcription by RNA polymerase II; negative regulation of cell population proliferation; cellular response to hydrogen peroxide; positive regulation of inflammatory response; pri-miRNA transcription by RNA polymerase II; positive regulation of leukocyte adhesion to vascular endothelial cell; positive regulation of gene expression; positive regulation of blood vessel endothelial cell migration; positive regulation of angiogenesis; cell differentiation
Sources:Amigo / QuickGO
Orthologs
Databases	NCBI: entry; OMA: entry
Species	Human	Mouse
Entrez	2113	23871
Ensembl	ENSG00000134954	ENSMUSG00000032035
UniProt	P14921	P27577
RefSeq (mRNA)	NM_001143820; NM_001162422; NM_005238; NM_001330451	NM_001038642; NM_011808
RefSeq (protein)	NP_001137292; NP_001155894; NP_001317380; NP_005229	NP_001033731; NP_035938; NP_001359463; NP_001359464; NP_001359465 NP_001359466
Location (UCSC)	Chr 11: 128.46 – 128.59 Mb	Chr 9: 32.64 – 32.76 Mb
PubMed search
- Wikidata
View/Edit Human	View/Edit Mouse

Protein C-ets-1 is a protein that in humans is encoded by the ETS1 gene. The protein encoded by this gene belongs to the ETS transcription factor family.

== Function ==
There are 28 ETS genes in humans and 27 in mice. They bind the DNA via their winged-helix-turn-helix DNA binding motif known as the Ets domain that specifically recognizes DNA sequences that contain a GGAA/T core element. However, Ets proteins differ significantly in their preference for the sequence flanking the GGAA/T core motif. For instance, the consensus sequence for Ets1 is PuCC/a-GGAA/T-GCPy. On the other hand, many natural Ets1-responsive GGAA/T elements differ from this consensus sequence. The later suggests that several other transcription factors may facilitate Ets1 binding to unfavorable DNA sequences. ChIP-Seq studies have shown that Ets1 can bind both AGGAAG and CGGAAG motifs.

Ets1 binds to DNA as a monomer. Phosphorylation of serine residues of the C-terminal domain (in the nucleotide sequence they belong to exon VII) known as autoinhibition makes Ets1 inactive. There are several ways to activate Ets1. First, Ets1 can be dephosphorylated. Second, two Ets1 can be activated If two Ets molecules homodimerize. The homodimerization occurs if DNA binding sites are present in the correct orientation and spacing. Thus, the exact layout of binding sites within an enhancer or promoter segment to either relieve or allow autoinhibition of Ets1 to occur may strongly influence whether or not Ets1 actually binds to particular site. Third, Ets1 can be activated by Erk2 and Ras at Thr38. The truncated isoform cannot be phosphorylated by the Erk2. It is localized in the cytoplasm and acts as a dominant negative isoform. Contrary, another isoform that misses exon VII is constitutively active. Many Ras responsive genes harbor combinatorial Ets/AP1 recognition motifs through which Ets1 and AP1 synergistically activate transcription when stimulated by Ras.

In adult humans, Ets1 is expressed at high levels mainly in immune tissues such as thymus, spleen, and lymph node (B cells, T cells, NK cells, and NK T cells and non-lymphoid immune cells). An enforced expression of Ets1 blocks differentiation of B- and T-cells. By contrast, knocking Ets1 down causes multiple defects in the immune system.

== Knockout mice ==
Ets1 knockout mice have aberrant thymic differentiation, reduced peripheral T cell numbers, reduced IL-2 production, a skewing towards a memory/effector phenotype and impairments in the production of Th1 and Th2 cytokines. Although Ets1 knockout mice have an impaired development of Th1, Th2, and Treg cells, they have higher numbers of Th17 cells. In CD4/CD8 double positive thymocytes from Ets knockout mice, both the suppression of gene expression programs corresponding to alternative lineages and upregulation of T-cell specific genes are impaired. There are also partial defects in bone marrow B cell development with reduced cellularity and inefficient transition from pro-B to pre-B cell stages.

== Clinical significance ==
Meta-analyses of multiple genome-wide association studies has suggested an association of SNPs in the ETS1 locus with psoriasis in European populations. This is not surprising because Ets1 is a negative regulator of Th17 cells.

Ets1 overexpression in stratified squamous epithelial cells causes pro-oncogenic changes, such as suspension of terminal differentiation, high secretion of matrix metalloproteases (Mmps), epidermal growth factor ligands, and inflammatory mediators.

== Interactions ==
Ets1 directly interacts with various transcription factors. Their interaction results in formation of multiprotein complexes. When Ets1 interacts with other transcription factors (Runx1, Pax5, TFE3, and USF1) its final effect on transcription depends on whether C-terminal domain is phosphorylated. Acetyltransferases CBP and p300 bind to the transactivation domain. AP1, STAT5 and VDR bind to C-terminal domain.

Also, ETS1 has been shown to interact with TTRAP, UBE2I and Death-associated protein 6.

Importantly, ETS1 was shown to be able to bind both nucleosome-bound and -depleted DNA, with its suppression leading to increases in nucleosomal occupancy at sites normally bound by ETS1.

== Interaction with DNA repair promoters and proteins ==
=== DNA repair promoters ===
The messenger RNA and protein levels of DNA repair protein PARP1 are controlled, in part, by the expression level of the ETS1 transcription factor which interacts with multiple ETS1 binding sites in the promoter region of PARP1. The degree to which the ETS1 transcription factor can bind to its binding sites on the PARP1 promoter depends on the methylation status of the CpG islands in the ETS1 binding sites in the PARP1 promoter. If these CpG islands in ETS1 binding sites of the PARP1 promoter are epigenetically hypomethylated, PARP1 is expressed at an elevated level. The high constitutive levels of PARP1 in centenarians, providing more effective DNA repair, is thought to contribute to their unusual longevity. These levels of PARP1 expression are considered to be due to altered epigenetic control of transactivation of PARP1 expression.

As shown by Wilson et al., increased ETS1 expression causes about 50 target genes to increase expression, including DNA repair genes MUTYH, BARD1, ERCC1 and XPA. Increased ETS1 expression causes resistance to cell killing by cisplatin, the resistance thought to be partly due to increased expression of DNA repair genes.

=== DNA repair protein interactions ===
ETS1 functions are regulated by protein – protein interactions. In particular, ETS1 protein interacts with several DNA repair proteins. ETS1 binds with DNA-dependent protein kinase (DNA-PK) [where the DNA-PK complex is made up of DNA-PKcs and DNA repair Ku (protein), and where Ku itself is a heterodimer of two polypeptides, Ku70 (XRCC6) and Ku80 (XRCC5)]. ETS1 interaction with DNA-PK phosphorylates ETS1. Such phosphorylation of ETS1 alters its target gene repertoire. The Ku80 portion of DNA-PK, acting alone, interacts with ETS1 to down-regulate at least one of its transcriptional activities.

As shown by Legrand et al., ETS1 protein interacts with PARP1 protein. ETS1 activates PARP1, causing poly ADP-ribosylation of PARP1 itself and of other proteins, even in the absence of nicked DNA. PARP1 (without self- poly ADP-ribosylation), in turn, is needed for activation of the transactivating activity of ETS1 on a tested promoter. Active PARP1 subsequently causes poly ADP-ribosylation of ETS1, and this appears to promote ETS1 ubiquitination and proteasomal degradation, preventing excessive activity of ETS1.
