= Margaret Hurlstone Hardy Fallding =

Developmental biologist

Margaret Hardy Fallding
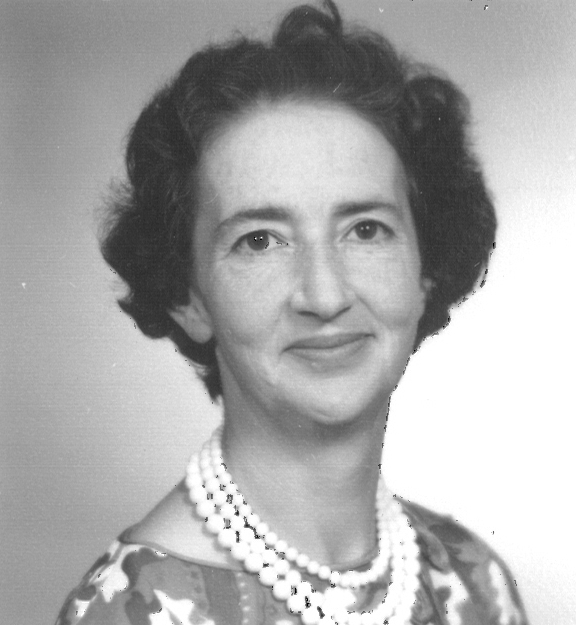
- Hardy Fallding in 1968
- Born: July 18, 1920; Sydney, New South Wales
- Died: 30 May 2004 (aged 83)
- Education: University of Queensland
- Known for: Research on hair follicles
- Spouse: Harold Joseph Fallding
- Scientific career
- Fields: Developmental biology, tissue culture
- Workplaces: Commonwealth Scientific and Industrial Research Organisation, University of Guelph
- Doctoral advisor: Honor Fell, Cambridge

Margaret Hurlstone Hardy Fallding (July 18, 1920 – May 30, 2004) was a developmental biologist in Australia and Canada who studied hair follicles.

== Early life ==
Margaret "Peggy" Hurlstone Hardy was born in Sydney, Australia, in 1920 and grew up in Brisbane, Queensland. She was a third-generation scientist – the only child of Australian entomologist George Hudleston Hurlstone Hardy and granddaughter of British engineer and amateur entomologist George Hurlstone Hardy. Peggy's father worked in the biology department of the University of Queensland, where he held a Walter and Eliza Hall Fellowship in Economic Biology from 1922 to 1933. Peggy's mother, Martha Elizabeth Olive Harris, was a former Tasmanian schoolteacher.

Peggy attended Somerville House, where she was dux of the school in 1937, and then enrolled at the University of Queensland in 1938. She took her Bachelor of Science (honours) in zoology and received a university gold medal in 1942. She won the Duncan McNaughton Scholarship in 1940 and, after completing her MSc in zoology, was awarded in 1943 the same fellowship in economic biology formerly held by her father.

Hardy worked at the University of Sydney and at the CSIR McMaster Animal Health Laboratory during her fellowship, studying the heat tolerance, skin, and fibres of sheep. At McMaster, she met Helen Newton Turner, who became a scientific collaborator and lifelong friend.

== Career ==
In 1945, Hardy was appointed assistant research officer at the CSIR after her mentor Harold Burnell Carter challenged arguments that women were "a poor investment." She went to the University of Cambridge in 1947 and studied at Newnham College, earning her zoology PhD in 1949 under the direction of cell biologist Dame Honor Fell. While still in her 20s, Hardy was the first person in the world to grow hair outside a living organism.

After returning to Australia, Hardy became vice principal of the Women's College at the University of Sydney and a member of the board of reference for the Evangelical Union's "Mission in the University" in 1951. It was in Sydney that Hardy got to know sociologist and poet Harold Fallding, who shared her intellectual approach to Christian evangelism. In 1954, future Anglican primate Rev. Marcus Loane officiated at Hardy's marriage to Fallding in the Moore College chapel as she became Margaret Hardy-Fallding. She was forced out of her job with the Commonwealth Scientific and Industrial Research Organisation because the Australian public service refused to employ married women. However, CSIRO was unable to find a replacement and rehired her.

Soon after, Margaret "had to slow down on embryonic hair follicle culture because I was culturing an embryonic human." She gave birth to three children, all delivered by her friend Margaret Mulvey, dubbed the "mother of Australian obstetrics," before returning to a scientific career.

In the 1960s, the Falldings moved to North America, where Margaret worked at Columbia University in New York before joining the staff of Canada's Ontario Veterinary College in 1966 as its second female faculty member. There she taught embryology and histology in the University of Guelph's department of biomedical sciences. In both countries, anti-nepotism rules barred her from positions at universities where her husband worked and thus forced her to commute to other cities for more than 30 years. Margaret technically retired in 1985 as professor emeritus, with close to 100 publications on her curriculum vitae, but continued her lab work for another decade. In 1985-6, she was president of the Guelph chapter of Sigma Xi, the international scientific research society.

Margaret Hardy Fallding died in Guelph, Ontario, Canada, in 2004. She was survived by her husband, University of Waterloo professor emeritus Dr. Harold Joseph Fallding, three daughters and one granddaughter.

== Legacy ==
Hardy's curiosity-driven research inspired a new generation of stem cell scientists to use hair follicles as "an accessible and intricately beautiful model system."

== Selected published works ==
- Hardy, M. H. (1951). The development of pelage hairs and vibrissae from skin in tissue culture. Annals of the New York Academy of Sciences, 53(3): 546-561.
- Hardy, M. H., Fraser, A. S. and Short, B. F. (1952). Spread of Pigment in Sheep Skin Autografts. Nature. 170(4333): 849.
- Hardy, M. H., Biggers, J. D. and Claringbold, P. J. (1953). Vaginal Cornification of the Mouse produced by Œstrogens in vitro. Nature, 172(4391): 1196.
- Hardy, M. H. and Lyne, A. G. (1956). Proposed Terminology for Wool Follicles in Sheep. Nature, 177(4511): 705.
- Carter, H. B., Turner, H. N. and Hardy, M. H. (1958). The influence of various factors on some methods of estimating fibre and follicle population density in the skin of Merino sheep. I. Methods of delineating area of natural skin. Australian Journal of Agricultural Research, 9(2): 237–251.
- Hardy, M. H. (1967). Responses in embryonic mouse skin to excess vitamin A in organotypic cultures from the trunk, upper lip and lower jaw. Experimental Cell Research, 46(2): 367-384.
- Josefowicz, W. J. and Hardy, M. H. (1978). The expression of the gene asebia in the laboratory mouse: I. Epidermis and dermis. Genetical Research, 31(1): 53-65.
- Covant, H. A. and Hardy, M. H. (1988). Stability of the glandular morphogenesis produced by retinoids in the newborn hamster cheek pouch in vitro. Journal of Experimental Zoology, 246(2): 139-149.
- Brown, W. R. and Hardy, M. H. (1989). Mast Cells in Asebia Mouse Skin. Journal of Investigative Dermatology, 93(5): 708.
- Hardy, M. H., Roff, E., Smith, T. G., Ryg, M. (1991). Facial skin glands of ringed and grey seals, and their possible function as odoriferous organs. Canadian Journal of Zoology (Revue canadienne de zoologie), 69(1): 189-200.
- Hardy, M. H. (1992). The secret life of the hair follicle. Trends in Genetics, 8(2): 55-61.
- Hardy, M. H. and Vielkind, U. (1996). Changing patterns of cell adhesion molecules during mouse pelage hair follicle development. 1. Follicle morphogenesis in wild-type mice. Acta Anat (Basel), 157(3):169-82.
