= STNFR =

Soluble tumor necrosis factor receptors (sTNFR) are the cleaved-off extracellular domains of transmembrane TNF receptors. They are proposed to enter the bloodstream either via shedding by the enzyme TACE or through exocytosis of the full-length receptor in exosome-like vesicles. Elevated levels of sTNFR are seen in inflammatory processes such as infection, malignancy and autoimmune diseases.
