= Organ culture =

Cultivation of organ tissue in vitro

Organ culture is the cultivation of either whole organs or parts of organs in vitro. It is a development from tissue culture methods of research, as the use of the actual in vitro organ itself allows for more accurate modelling of the functions of an organ in various states and conditions.

A key objective of organ culture is to maintain the architecture of the tissue and direct it towards normal development. In this technique, it is essential that the tissue is never disrupted or damaged. It thus requires careful handling. The media used for a growing organ culture are generally the same as those used for tissue culture. The techniques for organ culture can be classified into (i) those employing a solid medium and (ii) those employing liquid medium.

Organ culture technology has contributed to advances in embryology, inflammation, cancer, and stem cell biology research.

== Current progress ==
In April 2006, scientists reported a successful trial of seven bladders grown in-vitro and given to humans. A bladder has been cultured by Anthony Atala of the Wake Forest Institute for Regenerative Medicine in Winston-Salem, North Carolina. A jawbone has been cultured at Columbia University, a lung has been cultured at Yale. A beating rat heart has been cultured by Doris Taylor at the University of Minnesota. An artificial kidney has been cultured by H. David Humes at the University of Michigan.

Silk cut from silkworm cocoons has been successfully used as growth scaffolding for heart tissue production. Heart tissue does not regenerate if damaged, so producing replacement patches is of great interest. The experiment used rat heart cells and produced functional heart tissue. In order to further test applications to humans as a cure, a way to transform human stem cells into heart tissue would have to be found.

In 2015, Harald Ott was able to grow a rat forelimb. He now works at Ott Lab which focuses on the creation of bioartificial hearts, lungs, tracheas and kidneys.

In 2016, another test was done in which human cells were used to assemble intricately structured hearts. The hearts ultimately proved immature but proved we were yet one step further to making a heart from stem cells.

In January 2017, scientists from Salk Institute for Biological Studies managed to create a pig embryo that had part of its DNA, critical for the growth of organs, edited out. They then introduced human stem cells inside the pig embryo to have the human DNA fill in the gaps.

In March 2022, research was published that demonstrated the tentative success of a corneal implant called BPCDX that was shown to have significant tissue attachment and host cell migration once implanted.

== Methodology ==
=== In vitro culture ===
Embryonic organ culture is an easier alternative to normal organ culture derived from adult animals. The following are four techniques employed for embryonic organ culture.

==== Plasma clot method ====
The following are general steps in organ culture on plasma clots.

1. Prepare a plasma clot by mixing 15 drops of plasma with five drops of embryo extract in a watch glass.
2. Place a watch glass on a pad of cotton wool in a petri dish; cotton wool is kept moist to prevent excessive evaporation from the dish.
3. Place a small, carefully dissected piece of tissue on top of the plasma clots in watch glass.

The technique has now been modified, and a raft of lens paper or rayon net is used on which the tissue is placed. Transfer of the tissue can then be achieved by raft easily. Excessive fluid is removed and the net with the tissue placed again on the fresh pool of medium.

==== Agar gel method ====
Media solidified with agar are also used for organ culture and these media consist of 7 parts 1% agar in BSS, 3 parts chick embryo extract and 3 parts of horse serum. Defined media with or without serum are also used with agar. The medium with agar provides the mechanical support for organ culture. It does not liquefy. Embryonic organs generally grow well on agar, but adult organ culture will not survive on this medium.

The culture of adult organs or parts from adult animals is more difficult due to their greater requirement of oxygen. A variety of adult organs (e.g. the liver) have been cultured using special media with special apparatus (Towell's II culture chamber). Since serum was found to be toxic, serum-free media were used, and the special apparatus permitted the use of 95% oxygen.

==== Raft Methods ====
In this approach the explant is placed onto a raft of lens paper or rayon acetate, which is floated on serum in a watch glass. Rayon acetate rafts are made to float on the serum by treating their 4 corners with silicone.

Similarly, floatability of lens paper is enhanced by treating it with silicone. On each raft, 4 or more explants are usually placed.

In a combination of raft and clot techniques, the explants are first placed on a suitable raft, which is then kept on a plasma clot. This modification makes media changes easy, and prevents the sinking of explants into liquefied plasma.

==== Grid Method ====
Initially devised by Trowell in 1954, the grid method utilizes 25 mm x 25 mm pieces of a suitable wire mesh or perforated stainless steel sheet whose edges are bent to form 4 legs of about 4 mm height.

Skeletal tissues are generally placed directly on the grid but softer tissues like glands or skin are first placed on rafts, which are then kept on the grids.

The grids themselves are placed in a culture chamber filled with fluid medium up to the grid; the chamber is supplied with a mixture of O_{2} and CO_{2} to meet the high O_{2} requirements of adult mammalian organs. A modification of the original grid method is widely used to study the growth and differentiation of adult and embryonic tissues.

== Uses ==
Cultured organs can be an alternative for organs from other (living or deceased) people. This is useful as the availability of transplantable organs (derived from other people) is declining in developed countries. Another advantage is that cultured organs, created using the patients own stem cell, allows for organ transplants where the patient would no longer require immunosuppressive drugs.

== Limitations ==
- Results from in vitro organ cultures are often not comparable to those from in vivo studies (e.g. studies on drug action) since the drugs are metabolized in vivo but not in vitro.

== See also ==
- Cell culture
- Tissue culture
- 3D bioprinting
