= George Hudleston Hurlstone Hardy =

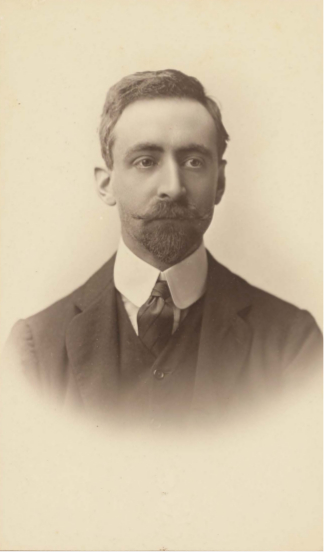
- George Hudleston Hurlstone Hardy, circa 1915
- Born: 14 August 1883; Twickenham, England
- Died: 9 January 1966 (aged 83); Austinmer, New South Wales, Australia
- Known for: Collecting Australian flies
- Spouse: Martha Elizabeth Olive Harris
- Children: Margaret Hurlstone Hardy Fallding
- Scientific career
- Fields: entomology
- Institutions: Tasmanian Museum and Art Gallery, University of Queensland

George Hudleston Hurlstone Hardy (14 August 1882 – 9 January 1966) was an entomologist who specialized in the biology of Diptera, especially Asilidae, Muscidae, Calliphoridae and Sarcophagidae.

He was the eldest son of Matilda Margaret Hudleston and English engineer and amateur entomologist Major George Hurlstone Hardy, who wrote The Book of the Fly. Hardy grew up in the Old House on Park Road in Twickenham and his second cousin was composer William Yeates Hurlstone. Hardy studied engineering at the Northumberland Institute and abandoned his Roman Catholic faith after reading Darwin's On the Origin of Species.

After migrating to Australia in 1911, Hardy became assistant curator of the Tasmanian Museum, then a fellow in economic biology at the University of Queensland. His collection, including his types, is shared between the Tasmanian Museum and the Australian Museum. Other collections are in the CSIRO Division of Economic Entomology and the University of Queensland Insect Collection. Hardy collected Diptera of the principle families throughout Australia, including Tasmania. He published notes on Diptera and descriptions of new species in Papers and Proceedings of the Royal Society of Tasmania, Proceedings of the Linnean Society of New South Wales, The Australian Journal of Zoology, Records of the Australian Museum, Proceedings of the Royal Society of Queensland, Bulletin of Entomological Research, Annals and Magazine of Natural History and the Entomologist's Monthly Magazine. The Bishop Museum has a bibliography and many Hardy papers are online at Biodiversity Heritage Library URL. The Tasmanian Museum and Art Gallery holds Hardy's microscope and some personal papers and the London Borough of Richmond upon Thames local studies archive holds some Hardy family papers.

In 1923, Hardy established the Entomological Society of Queensland – one of Australia's oldest continuously operating scientific societies. He was also among the founding members of the Australian Entomological Society.

He married Tasmanian schoolteacher Martha Elizabeth Olive Harris, who was a nature lover and helped with his work. Hardy named the striking Tasmanian fly Pelecorhynchus olivei in her honour. They had only one child, biologist Margaret Hurlstone Hardy, but sheep geneticist Helen Newton Turner called them her "second mother and father."

Hardy lived in the Brisbane suburbs of Toowong, Sunnybank and then Annerley, at Waldheim, which is now a Brisbane heritage building, before retiring in Katoomba, NSW, Australia.
