= ADAM 17 endopeptidase =

Class of enzymes

Identifiers
- EC no.: 3.4.24.86
- CAS no.: 151769-16-3

Databases
- IntEnz: IntEnz view
- BRENDA: BRENDA entry
- ExPASy: NiceZyme view
- KEGG: KEGG entry
- MetaCyc: metabolic pathway
- PRIAM: profile
- PDB structures: RCSB PDB PDBe PDBsum
Search
- PMC: articles
- PubMed: articles
- NCBI: proteins

ADAM 17 endopeptidase (EC 3.4.24.86, tumor necrosis factor alpha-converting enzyme, TACE) is an enzyme. This enzyme catalyses the following chemical reaction

Narrow endopeptidase specificity. Cleaves Pro-Leu-Ala-Gln-Ala-Val-Arg-Ser-Ser-Ser in the membrane-bound, 26-kDa form of tumor necrosis factor alpha (TNFalpha). Similarly cleaves other membrane-anchored, cell-surface proteins to "shed" the extracellular domains

This enzyme belongs to the peptidase family M12.
