= Tumor necrosis factor receptor 1 =

Membrane receptor protein found in humans

TNFRSF1A
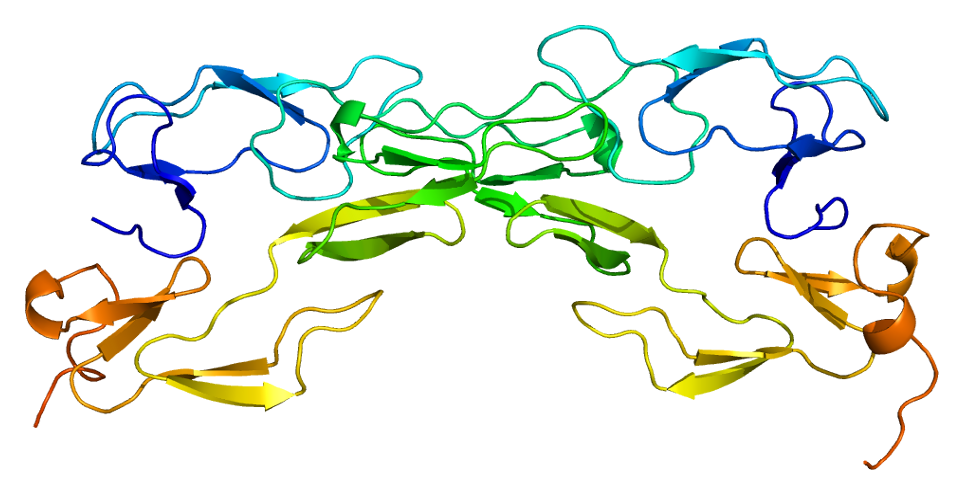

Identifiers
- Aliases: TNFRSF1A, CD120a, FPF, MS5, TBP1, TNF-R, TNF-R-I, TNF-R55, TNFAR, TNFR1, TNFR1-d2, TNFR55, TNFR60, p55, p55-R, p60, tumor necrosis factor receptor superfamily member 1A, TNF receptor superfamily member 1A
- External IDs: OMIM: 191190; MGI: 1314884; GeneCards: TNFRSF1A
Available structures
PDB	Ortholog search: PDBe RCSB
PDB	List of PDB id codes 1EXT, 1FT4, 1ICH, 1NCF, 1TNR

Gene location (Human)
Chr.	Chromosome 12 (human)
Band	12p13.31	Start	6,328,757 bp
Band	12p13.31	End	6,342,114 bp

Gene location (Mouse)
Chr.	Chromosome 6 (mouse)
Band	6 F3|6 59.32 cM	Start	125,326,325 bp
Band	6 F3|6 59.32 cM	End	125,339,447 bp
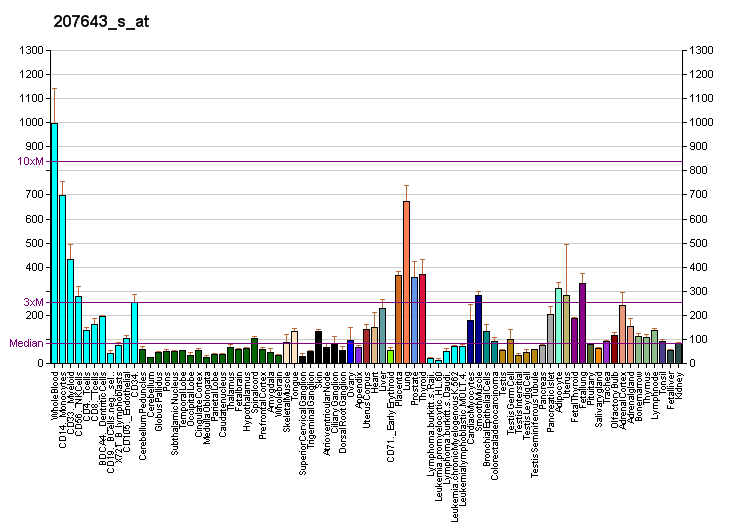
RNA expression pattern
Bgee	Human / Mouse (ortholog); Top expressed in: tendon of biceps brachii; gallbladder; left uterine tube; epithelium of colon; right coronary artery; upper lobe of left lung; left adrenal cortex; Descending thoracic aorta; pericardium; blood / Top expressed in: granulocyte; tibiofemoral joint; saccule; lip; stroma of bone marrow; otic placode; esophagus; calvaria; otic vesicle; ankle; More reference expression data
BioGPS	More reference expression data
Gene ontology
Molecular function	protein binding; tumor necrosis factor-activated receptor activity; tumor necrosis factor binding; identical protein binding
Cellular component	integral component of membrane; Golgi apparatus; membrane; Golgi membrane; receptor complex; plasma membrane; integral component of plasma membrane; extracellular region; cell surface; mitochondrion; membrane raft; extracellular space; tumor necrosis factor receptor superfamily complex
Biological process	regulation of apoptotic process; prostaglandin metabolic process; defense response; positive regulation of ceramide biosynthetic process; positive regulation of inflammatory response; regulation of tumor necrosis factor-mediated signaling pathway; tumor necrosis factor-mediated signaling pathway; response to lipopolysaccharide; cellular response to mechanical stimulus; death-inducing signaling complex assembly; regulation of cell population proliferation; defense response to bacterium; immune response; intrinsic apoptotic signaling pathway in response to DNA damage; positive regulation of I-kappaB kinase/NF-kappaB signaling; viral process; I-kappaB kinase/NF-kappaB signaling; negative regulation of inflammatory response; regulation of establishment of endothelial barrier; extrinsic apoptotic signaling pathway via death domain receptors; positive regulation of transcription by RNA polymerase II; signal transduction; apoptotic process; inflammatory response; cell surface receptor signaling pathway; positive regulation of tyrosine phosphorylation of STAT protein; protein localization to plasma membrane; cytokine-mediated signaling pathway; aortic valve development; pulmonary valve development; negative regulation of extracellular matrix constituent secretion; negative regulation of cardiac muscle hypertrophy; positive regulation of apoptotic process involved in morphogenesis
Sources:Amigo / QuickGO
Orthologs
Databases	NCBI: entry; OMA: entry
Species	Human	Mouse
Entrez	7132	21937
Ensembl	ENSG00000067182	ENSMUSG00000030341
UniProt	P19438	P25118
RefSeq (mRNA)	NM_001065; NM_001346091; NM_001346092	NM_011609
RefSeq (protein)	NP_001056; NP_001333020; NP_001333021	NP_035739
Location (UCSC)	Chr 12: 6.33 – 6.34 Mb	Chr 6: 125.33 – 125.34 Mb
PubMed search
- Wikidata
View/Edit Human	View/Edit Mouse

Tumor necrosis factor receptor 1 (TNFR1), also known as tumor necrosis factor receptor superfamily member 1A (TNFRSF1A) and CD120a, is a ubiquitous membrane receptor that binds tumor necrosis factor-alpha (TNFα).

== Function ==
The protein encoded by this gene is a member of the tumor necrosis factor receptor superfamily, which also contains TNFRSF1B. This protein is one of the major receptors for the tumor necrosis factor-alpha. This receptor can activate the transcription factor NF-κB, mediate apoptosis, and function as a regulator of inflammation. Antiapoptotic protein BCL2-associated athanogene 4 (BAG4/SODD) and adaptor proteins TRADD and TRAF2 have been shown to interact with this receptor, and thus play regulatory roles in the signal transduction mediated by the receptor.

== Clinical significance ==
Germline mutations of the extracellular domains of this receptor were found to be associated with the human genetic disorder called tumor necrosis factor associated periodic syndrome (TRAPS) or periodic fever syndrome. Impaired receptor clearance is thought to be a mechanism of the disease.

Mutations in the TNFRSF1A gene are associated with elevated risk of multiple sclerosis.

Serum levels of TNFRSF1A are elevated in schizophrenia and bipolar disorder, and high levels are associated with more severe psychotic symptoms.

High serum levels are also associated with cognitive impairment and dementia.

== Interactions ==
TNFRSF1A has been shown to interact with:

- BAG4,
- CASP10,
- FADD,
- IKK2,
- JAK1,
- JAK2,
- PIP4K2B,
- PSMD2,
- RIPK1,
- SUMO1,
- TRADD
- TRAF2,
- TRPC4AP,
- TNF, and
- UBE2I.

== See also ==
- Cluster of differentiation
- TNF receptor associated periodic syndrome
