= Tissue culture =

Growth of tissues or cells in an artificial medium separate from the parent organism

The growth, in an artificial medium, of cells derived from living tissues. This provides an in vitro model of the tissue and biological activities that occur in the cells of living organisms.

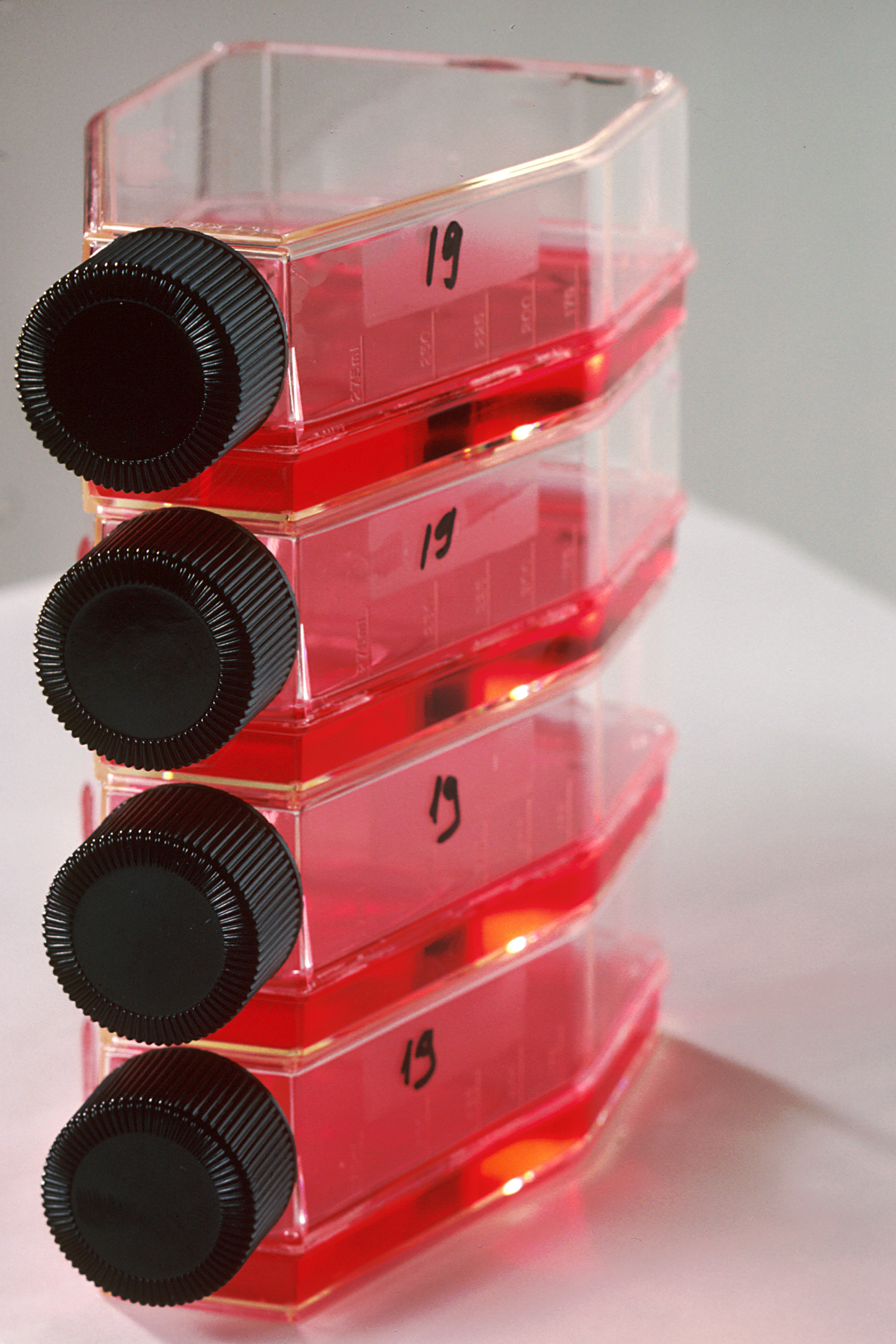
Flasks containing tissue culture growth medium which provides nourishment for the growing of cells.

Tissue culture is the growth of tissues or cells in an artificial medium separate from the parent organism. This technique is also called micropropagation. This is typically facilitated via use of a liquid, semi-solid, or solid growth medium, such as broth or agar. Tissue culture commonly refers to the culture of animal cells and tissues, with the more specific term plant tissue culture being used for plants. The term "tissue culture" was coined by American pathologist Montrose Thomas Burrows.

== Historical use ==
In 1885 Wilhelm Roux removed a section of the medullary plate of an embryonic chicken and maintained it in a warm saline solution for several days, establishing the basic principle of tissue culture. In 1907 the zoologist Ross Granville Harrison demonstrated the growth of frog embryonic cells that would give rise to nerve cells in a medium of clotted lymph. In 1913, E. Steinhardt, C. Israeli, and R. A. Lambert grew vaccinia virus in fragments of guinea pig corneal tissue. In 1996, the first use of regenerative tissue was used to replace a small length of urethra, which led to the understanding that the technique of obtaining samples of tissue, growing it outside the body without a scaffold, and reapplying it, can be used for only small distances of less than 1 cm.

Gottlieb Haberlandt first pointed out the possibilities of the culture of isolated tissues, plant tissue culture. He suggested that the potentialities of individual cells via tissue culture as well as that the reciprocal influences of tissues on one another could be determined by this method. Since Haberlandt's original assertions, methods for tissue and cell culture have been realized, leading to significant discoveries in biology and medicine. His original idea, presented in 1902, was called totipotentiality: "Theoretically all plant cells are able to give rise to a complete plant."

== Modern usage ==
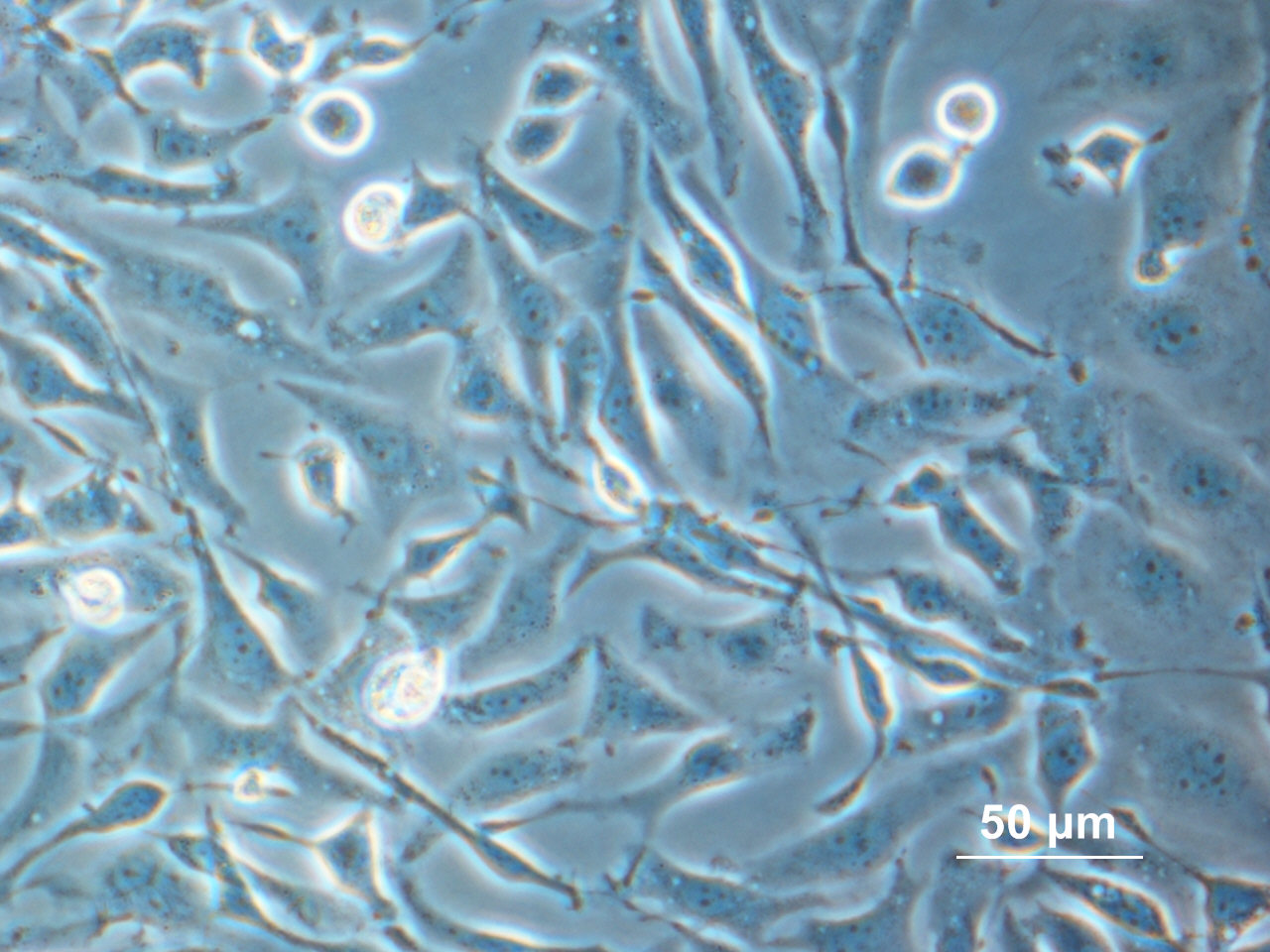
Cultured cells growing in growth medium

In modern usage, "Tissue culture" generally refers to the growth of cells from a multicellular organism in vitro. These cells may be cells isolated from a donor organism (primary cells) or an immortalised cell line. The cells are bathed in a culture medium, which contains essential nutrients and energy sources necessary for the cells' survival. Thus, in its broader sense, "tissue culture" is often used interchangeably with "cell culture". On the other hand, the strict meaning of "tissue culture" refers to the culturing of tissue pieces, i.e. explant culture.

Tissue culture is an important tool for the study of the biology of cells from multicellular organisms. It provides an in vitro model of the tissue in a well defined environment which can be easily manipulated and analysed. In animal tissue culture, cells may be grown as two-dimensional monolayers (conventional culture) or within fibrous scaffolds or gels to attain more naturalistic three-dimensional tissue-like structures (3D culture). Eric Simon, in a 1988 NIH SBIR grant report, showed that electrospinning could be used to produce nano- and submicron-scale polymeric fibrous scaffolds specifically intended for use as in vitro cell and tissue substrates. This early use of electrospun fibrous lattices for cell culture and tissue engineering showed that various cell types would adhere to and proliferate upon polycarbonate fibers. It was noted that as opposed to the flattened morphology typically seen in 2D culture, cells grown on the electrospun fibers exhibited a more rounded 3-dimensional morphology generally observed of tissues in vivo.

Plant tissue culture in particular is concerned with the growing of entire plants from small pieces of plant tissue, cultured in medium. The technique of plant tissue culture, i.e., culturing plant cells or tissues in artificial medium supplemented with required nutrients, has many applications in efficient clonal propagation (true to the type or similar) which may be difficult via conventional breeding methods. Tissue culture is used in creating genetically modified plants, as it allows scientists to introduce DNA changes to plant tissue via Agrobacterium tumefaciens or a gene gun and then generate a full plant from these modified cells.

Tissue cultures are commonly used in plant propagation. The advantage of such vegetative propagation is that it obtains a large amount of homogeneous material, which is of great importance in the propagation of valuable cultivars of ornamental plants, and rootstocks for fruit trees. In addition, fruit plants or flowers can be obtained free of viruses, phytoplasmas, viroids.

Because plant cells are totipotent, adding growth hormones to the media can trigger the callus cells to develop roots, shoots and entire plants.

== Animal tissue culture ==
There are three common methods to establish cell culture from animals. The first is organ culture where whole organs from embryos or partial adult organs are used to initiate the organ culture in vitro. These cells retain their differentiated character and functional activity in organ culture. The second method is primary explant culture, in which fragments derived from animal tissue are attached to a surface using an extracellular matrix component (ECM), such as collagen or a plasma clot. This culture is known as a primary explant, and migrating cells are known as outgrowth. This has been used to analyze the growth characteristics of cancer cells in comparison to their normal counterparts. The third method is cell culture, of which there are three types: (1) precursor cell culture, i.e. undifferentiated cells that are to be differentiate, (2) differentiated cell culture, i.e. completely differentiated cells that have lost the capacity to further differentiate, and (3) stem cell culture, i.e. undifferentiated cells that can develop into any kind of cell."

== Applications of animal cell culture ==
Animal cell culture is used for many research purposes and commercial business also as:

- Vaccine production
- Monoclonal antibody production
- Enzymes and hormones production
- In vitro skin and other tissues and organs by stem culturing
- Viral cultivation

== Establishing a cell line ==
Immortalized cell lines can be established through a variety of methods, including isolation from naturally occurring cancers, artificial expression of genes that deregulate the cell cycle, and hybridoma technology. Cell lines are often deposited in and obtained from centralized repositories of cell lines such as the American Type Culture Collection (ATCC).

== Subculture ==
Subculture is the transfer of cells from one culture to start a new one. During this process, the proliferating cells are subdivided to form new cell lines.

== Stem cell technology ==
The most advanced tissue culture science is now focused on stem cells. Stem cells are a primitive type of cell which has the ability to differentiate to all of the 220 cell types found in the human body, allowing for use in tissue and organ replacement. Stem cells can be obtained from blood, brain tissue, or muscle tissue, but the most important are from early embryos, which have the capability to differentiate to any other cell.

== See also ==
- Cell culture
- Cultured meat
- Microphysiometry
- Organ culture
- Plant tissue culture
