= Suffrage Science award =

Prize for women in science, engineering and computing

Suffrage Science Award
- Awarded for: "celebrating and inspiring women in science"
- Sponsored by: Medical Research Council and Department of Biochemistry, Oxford University
- Date: 2011
- Location: London and from 2024 in Oxford
- Country: United Kingdom
- Reward: Heirloom jewellery
- Website: www.suffragescience.com

The Suffrage Science award is a prize for women in science, engineering and computing founded in 2011, on the 100th anniversary of International Women's Day by the MRC London Institute of Medical Sciences (LMS). There are three categories of award:

1. life sciences
2. engineering and physical sciences
3. mathematics and computing.

The life sciences award was founded in 2011. Every year there are 10 laureates from research backgrounds and one laureate for communication. The engineering and physical sciences award was founded in 2013. Every year there are 12 laureates from areas spanning physics, chemistry and more. The math and computing award was launched on Ada Lovelace Day, 2016. Every year there are five laureates from mathematics, five laureates from computing and one laureate for science communication and the public awareness of science.

== Laureates ==
Laureates have included:

=== 2026 ===
Life Sciences

- Chrystalina Antoniades, University of Oxford
- Sarah Cooley, Earth Science Data Professionals Organization
- Cara Croft, Queen Mary University of London
- Camille Dion, Medical Sciences, London
- Dima A. Hammoud, NIH Clinical Centre
- Karoline Kuchenbaecker, University College, London
- Madeline Lancaster, LMB, Cambridge
- Liset Menéndez de la Prida, Instituto Cajal CSIC, Spain
- Arwen Pearson, University of Hamburg
- Kate Watkins, University of Oxford
- Dana Pe'er, HHMI, US

=== 2026 ===
Maths and Computing

- Abigail Sellen, Microsoft Research, Cambridge
- Vanessa Didelez, University of Bremen, Germany
- Susanne Bødker, Aarhus University, Denmark
- Anne Gégout-Petit, University of Lorraine, France
- Sara Bernardini, University of Oxford
- Judy Robertson, University of Edinburgh
- Els Goetghebeur, Ghent University, Belgium
- Azalea Raad, Imperial College, London
- Anja Schlömerkemper, Universitat Würzburg, Germany

=== 2025 ===
Engineering and Physical Sciences

- Alice Bunn, OBE, Institution of Mechanical Engineers
- Danielle Julie Carrier, University of Tennessee
- Francisca de Haan, Central European University
- Iryna Herzon, University of Helsinki
- Peace Korshiwor Amoatey, University of Ghana
- Catherine Le Visage, Nantes Université
- Priyamvada Natarajan, Yale University
- Thuc-Quyen Nguyen, University of California, Santa Barbara
- Rachel Oliver, University of Cambridge
- Suzanne Ramsay, European Southern Observatory
- Jayne Wallace, Oxford Nanopore Technologies
- Gerlind Wallon, European Molecular Biology Organization

=== 2024 ===
Life Sciences winners are:

- Areej Abuhammad, University of Jordan, Jordan
- Prisca Liberali, FMI, Basel
- Frederique Magdinier, Marseille Medical Genetics, France
- Azahara Oliva, Cornell University
- Lynn Rochester, University of Newcastle
- Marta Shahbazi, MRC LMB, Cambridge
- Monica Shokeen, Washington University School of Medicine
- Faraneh Vargha-Khadem, UCL Institute of Child Health, London
- Selina Wray, UCL Queen Square Institute of Neurology, London

=== 2021 ===
Engineering and Physical Sciences winners are:

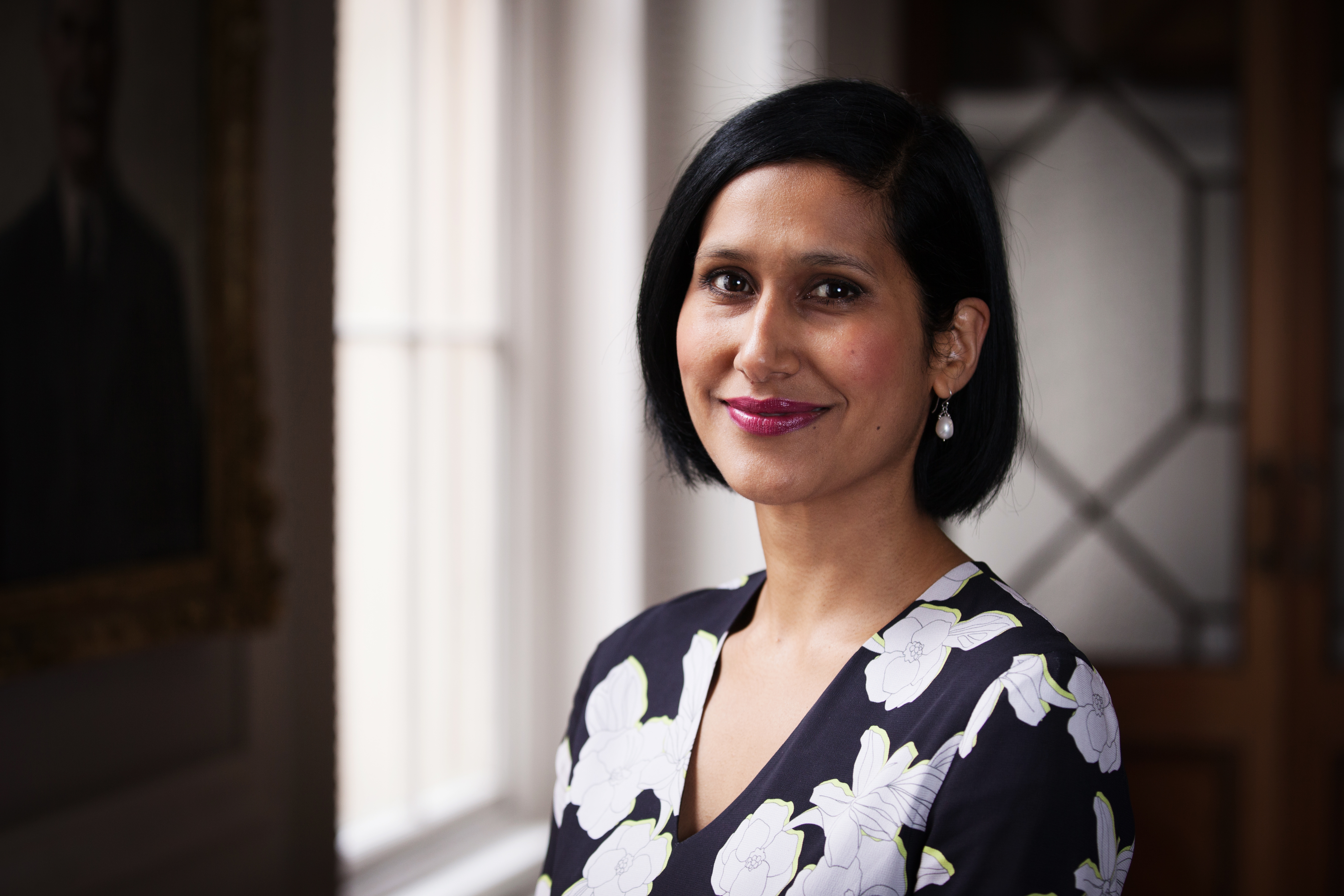
Hayaatun Sillem won the award in 2021

- Gaitee Hussain, European Space Agency, The Netherlands
- Syma Khalid, University of Southampton, UK
- Natalie Stingelin, Georgia Institute of Technology, USA
- Ina van Berckelaer-Onnes, Leiden University, The Netherlands
- Hayaatun Sillem, CBE, Royal Academy of Engineering, UK
- Ruth Cameron, University of Cambridge, UK
- Elin Röös, Swedish University of Agricultural Sciences, Sweden
- Maria Dolores Martín Bermudo, Centro Andaluz de Biología del Desarrollo, Spain
- Samaya Nissanke, University of Amsterdam and Nikhef, The Netherlands
- Gerjo van Osch, Erasmus University Medical Center, The Netherlands
- Valérie Orsat, McGill University, Canada
- Mary Anti Chama, University of Ghana, Ghana

=== 2020 ===
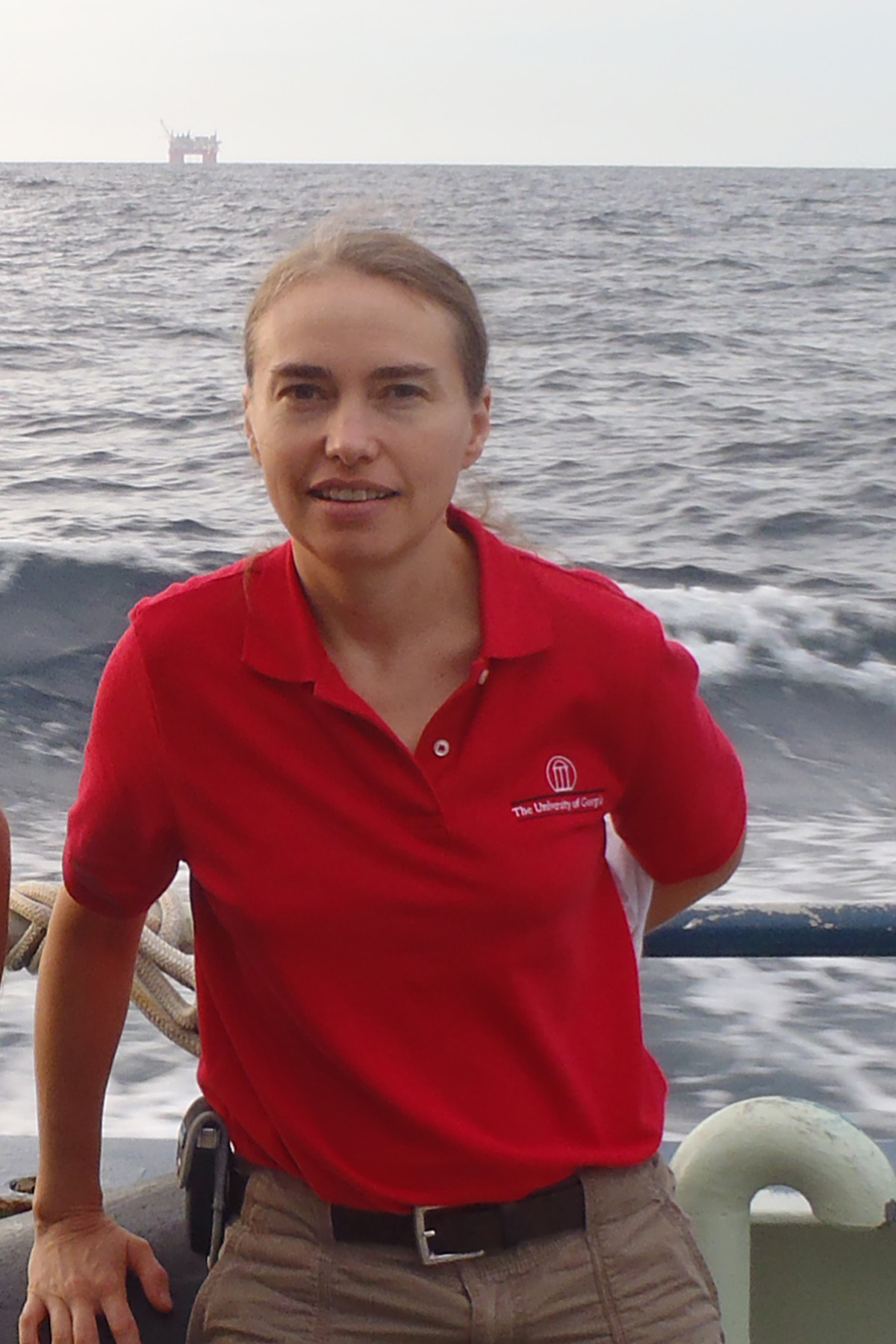
Samantha Joye won the award in 2020

Life Sciences award winners are:

- Kelly Nguyen (scientist), MRC Laboratory of Molecular Biology
- Naomi Matsuura, University of Toronto, Canada
- Elspeth Garman, University of Oxford, UK
- Veronique Miron, University of Edinburgh, UK
- Cécile Martinat, I-STEM, France
- Zena Werb, University of California, San Francisco, USA
- Samantha Joye, University of Georgia, USA
- Gisou van der Goot, EPFL Lausanne, Switzerland
- Karalyn Patterson, University of Cambridge, UK
- Laura Colgin, University of Texas Austin, USA
- Claudia Mazzà, University of Sheffield, UK

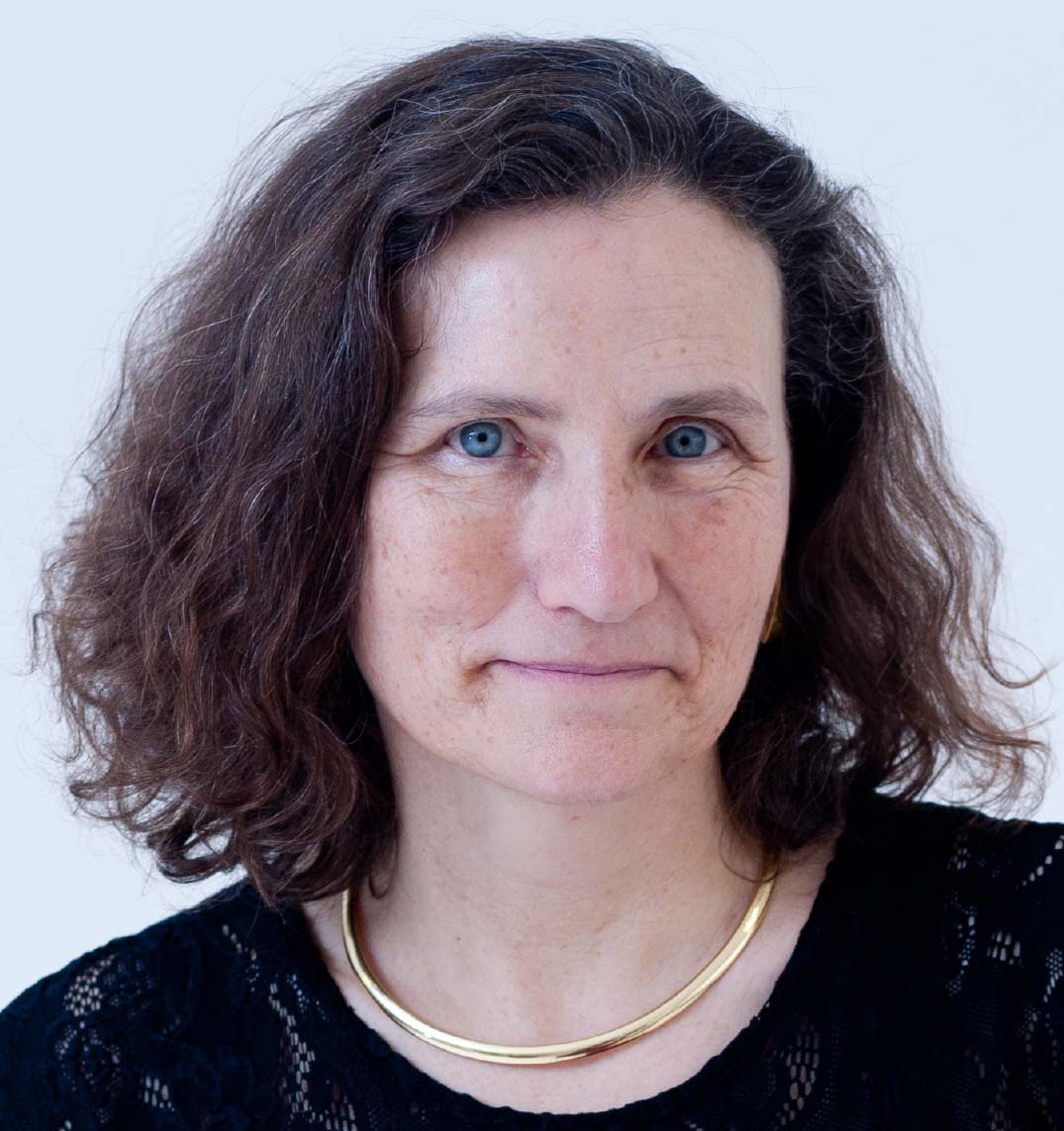
Wendy Mackay won the award in 2020.

Maths and Computing award winners are:

- Rhian Daniel, Cardiff University
- Juhyun Park, Lancaster University, UK, and ENSIIE, France
- Apala Majumdar, University of Strathclyde
- Bianca de Stavola, University College London
- Sara Lombardo, Loughborough University
- Wendy Mackay, Inria, Paris-Saclay, France
- Yvonne Rogers, University College London
- Alexandra Silva, University College London
- Nobuko Yoshida, Imperial College London
- Sue Sentance, King’s College London Raspberry Pi Foundation
- Anne-Marie Imafidon, STEMettes

=== 2019 ===
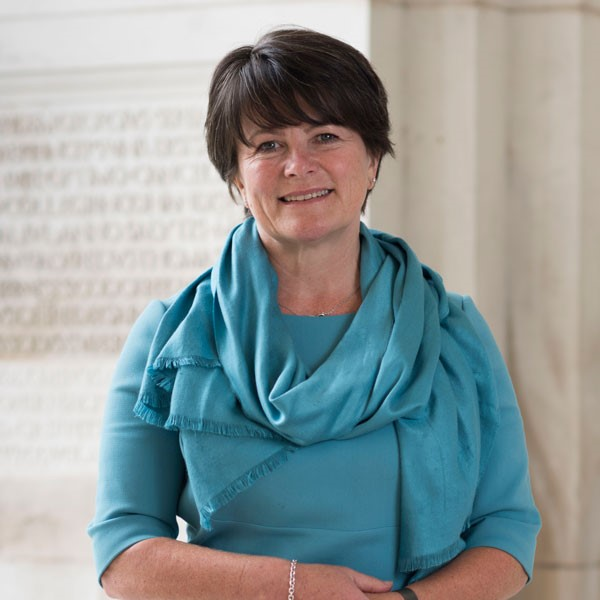
Karen Holford won the award in 2019.

Engineering and Physical Sciences

- Moira Jardine
- Sarah Harris
- Róisín Owens
- Tiny de Keuster, Universiteit Gent
- Karen Holford CBE FREng
- Serena Best
- Tara Garnett
- Isabel Palacios
- Amina Helmi
- Sue Kimber
- Marzieh Moosavi-Nasab
- Melinda Duer

=== 2018 ===
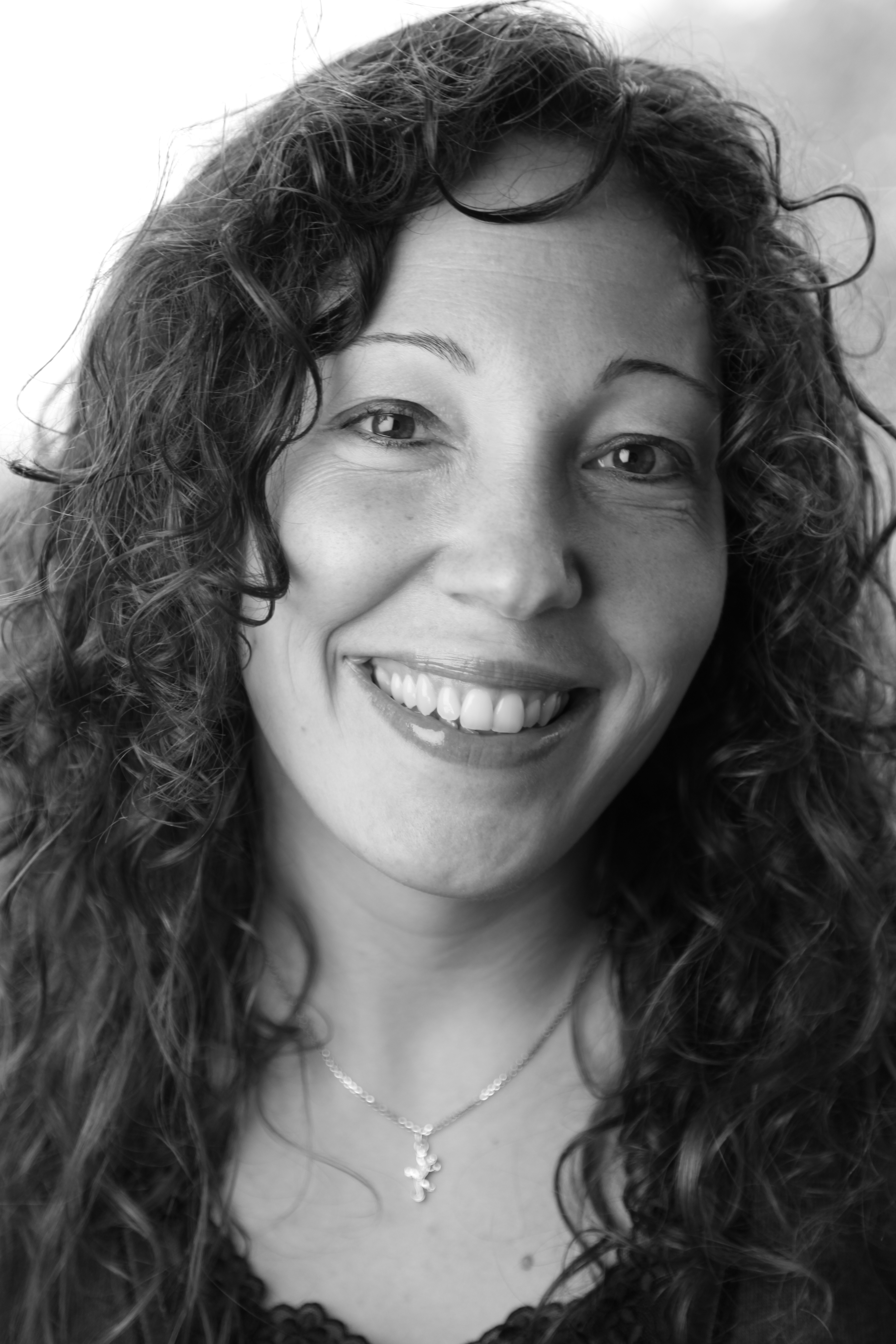
Nina Snaith won the award in 2018.

Life sciences:

- Cathy Price
- Rebecca Voorhees
- Claire Rougeulle
- Denise Head
- Jenny Martin
- Anna Wu
- Mikala Egeblad
- Irene Miguel-Aliaga
- Anat Mirelman
- Elizabeth Bradbury
- Susan M. Gaines

Maths and Computing

- Ruth Keogh
- Tereza Neocleous
- Nina Snaith
- Daniela De Angelis
- Eugenie Hunsicker
- Sally Fincher
- Julie McCann
- Jane Hillston
- Ursula Martin
- Hannah Dee
- Vicky Neale

=== 2017 ===
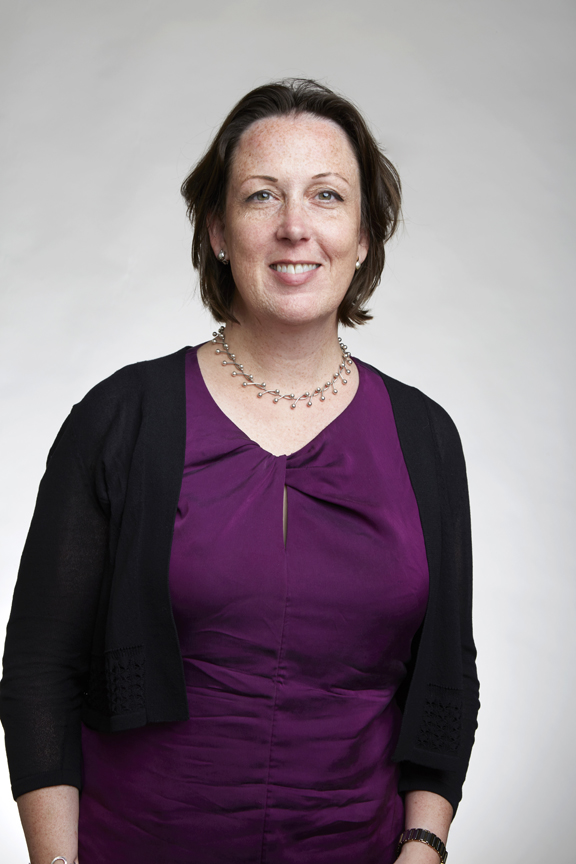
Sheila Rowan won the award in 2017.

Engineering

- Lyndsay Fletcher
- Sarah Staniland
- Rylie Green
- Kerstin Meints
- Sheila Rowan
- Cathy Holt
- Sabine Gabrysch
- Marta Vicente-Crespo
- Marileen Dogterom
- Sheila MacNeil
- Zohreh Azimifar
- Sharon Ashbrook

=== 2016 ===
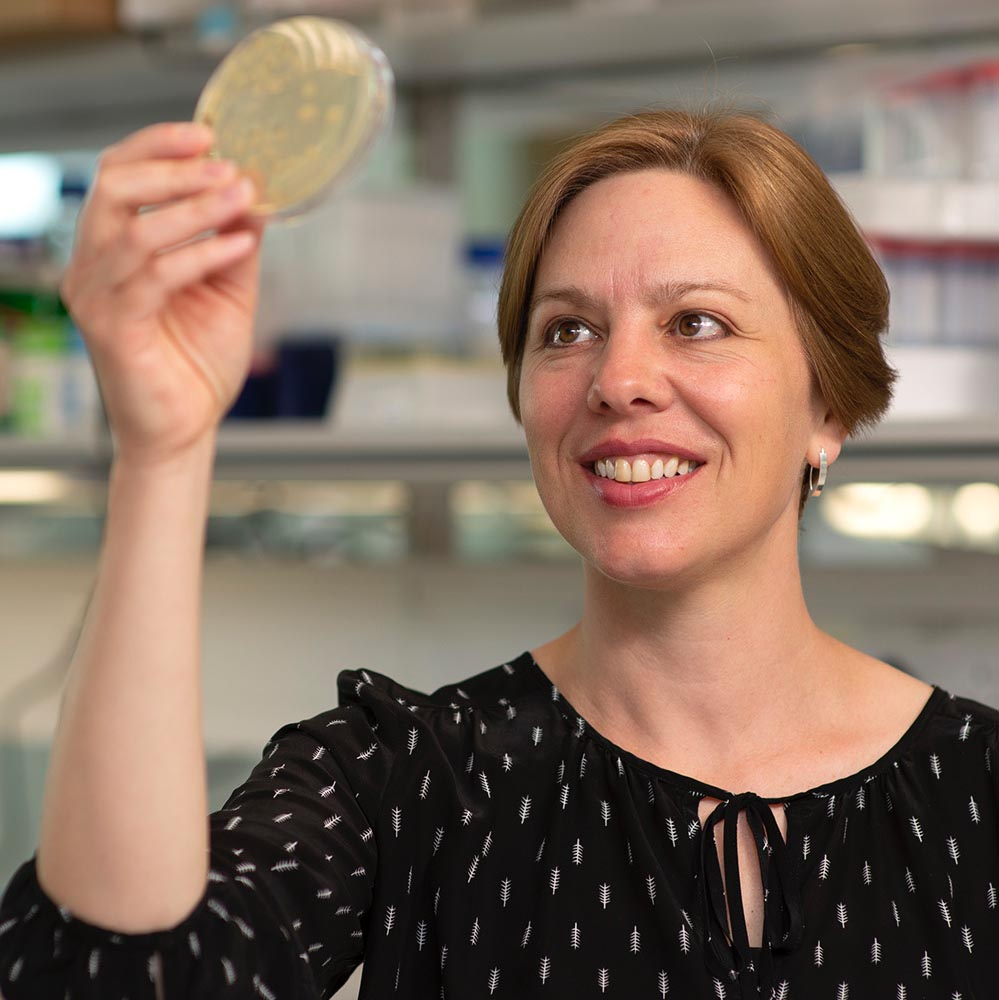
Lori Passmore won the award in 2016.

Life sciences:

- Kia Nobre
- Lori Passmore
- Déborah Bourc'his
- Uraina Clark
- Michelle James
- Marja Jäätelä
- Corinne Houart
- Sally John
- Catherina Becker
- Pippa Goldschmidt

Maths and computing:

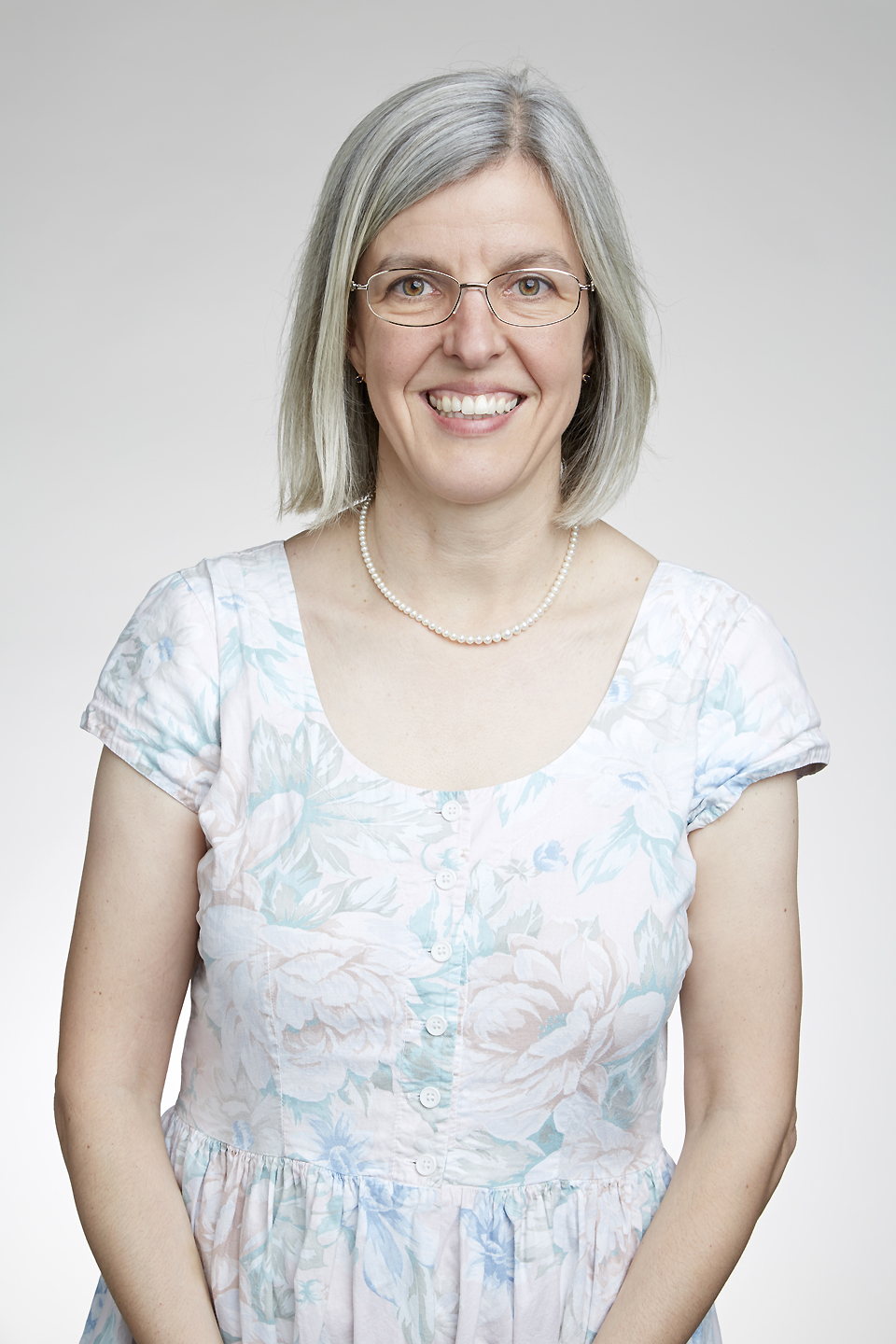
Christl Donnelly won the award in 2016.

- Christl Donnelly
- Jane Hutton
- Frances Kirwan
- Sylvia Richardson
- Gwyneth Stallard
- Ann Blandford
- Muffy Calder
- Leslie Ann Goldberg
- Wendy Hall
- Carron Shankland
- Celia Hoyles DBE FAcSS FIMA
- Shafi Goldwasser
- Marta Kwiatkowska FRS MAE
- Emma McCoy

=== 2015 ===
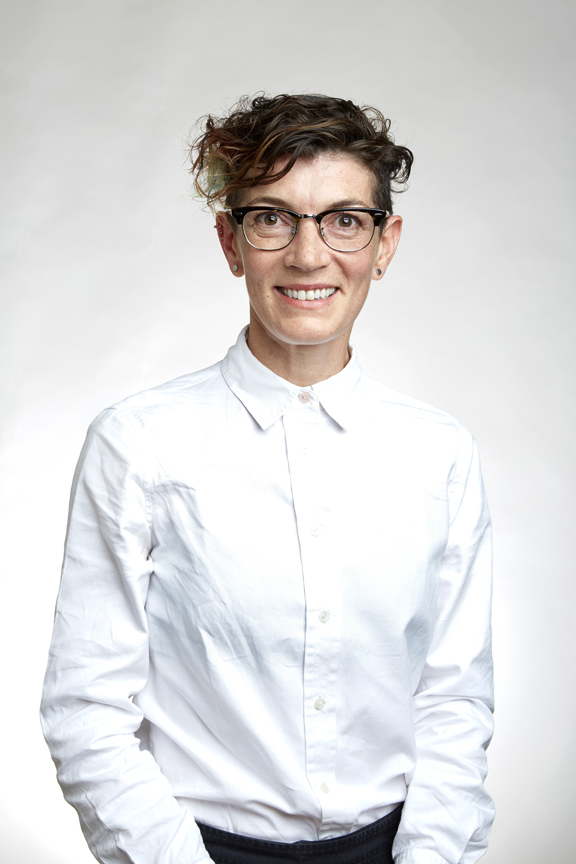
Polly Arnold won the award in 2015.

- Lucie Green
- Lorna Dougan
- Anne Vanhoestenberghe
- Susan Condor, Loughborough
- Anne Neville OBE FRS FRSE FREng FIMechE
- Ruth Wilcox, Leeds
- Anna Goodman (scientist) London School of Hygiene & Tropical Medicine (LSHTM)
- Silvia Muñoz-Descalzo University of Bath
- Patricia Bassereau, Curie institute
- Alicia El Haj
- Tamsin Edwards
- Polly Arnold OBE FRS FRSE FRSC

=== 2014 ===
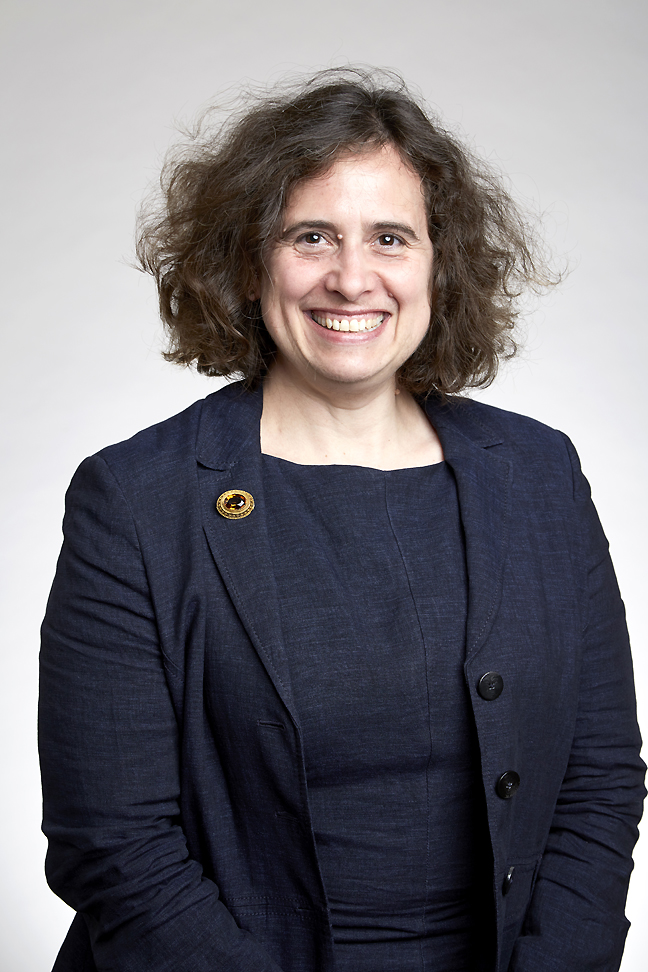
Anne Ferguson-Smith won the award in 2014.

- Irene Tracey
- Shannon Au
- Anne Ferguson-Smith
- Xiaomeng Xu
- Jane Endicott
- Sarah Bohndiek
- Anja Groth
- Kate Storey
- Eleftheria Zeggini
- Lynda Erskine
- Jennifer Rohn

=== 2013 ===
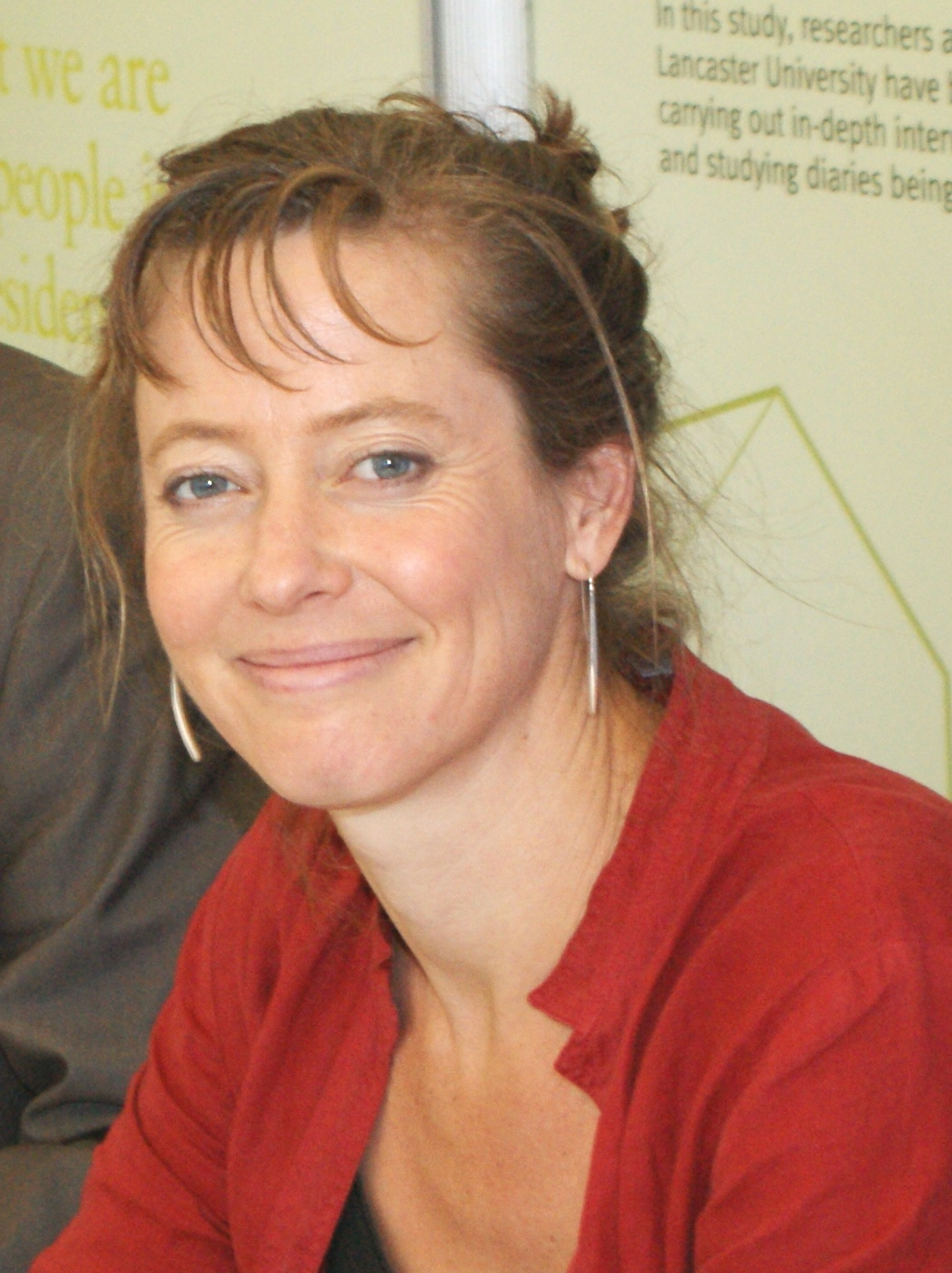
Kathy Sykes won the award in 2013.

- Julia Higgins
- Molly Stevens
- Lesley Yellowlees
- Eileen Ingham
- Jennifer Nichols
- Sally Macintyre
- Susan Gathercole
- Clare Elwell
- Petra Schwille
- Maggie Aderin-Pocock
- Kathy Sykes

=== 2012 ===
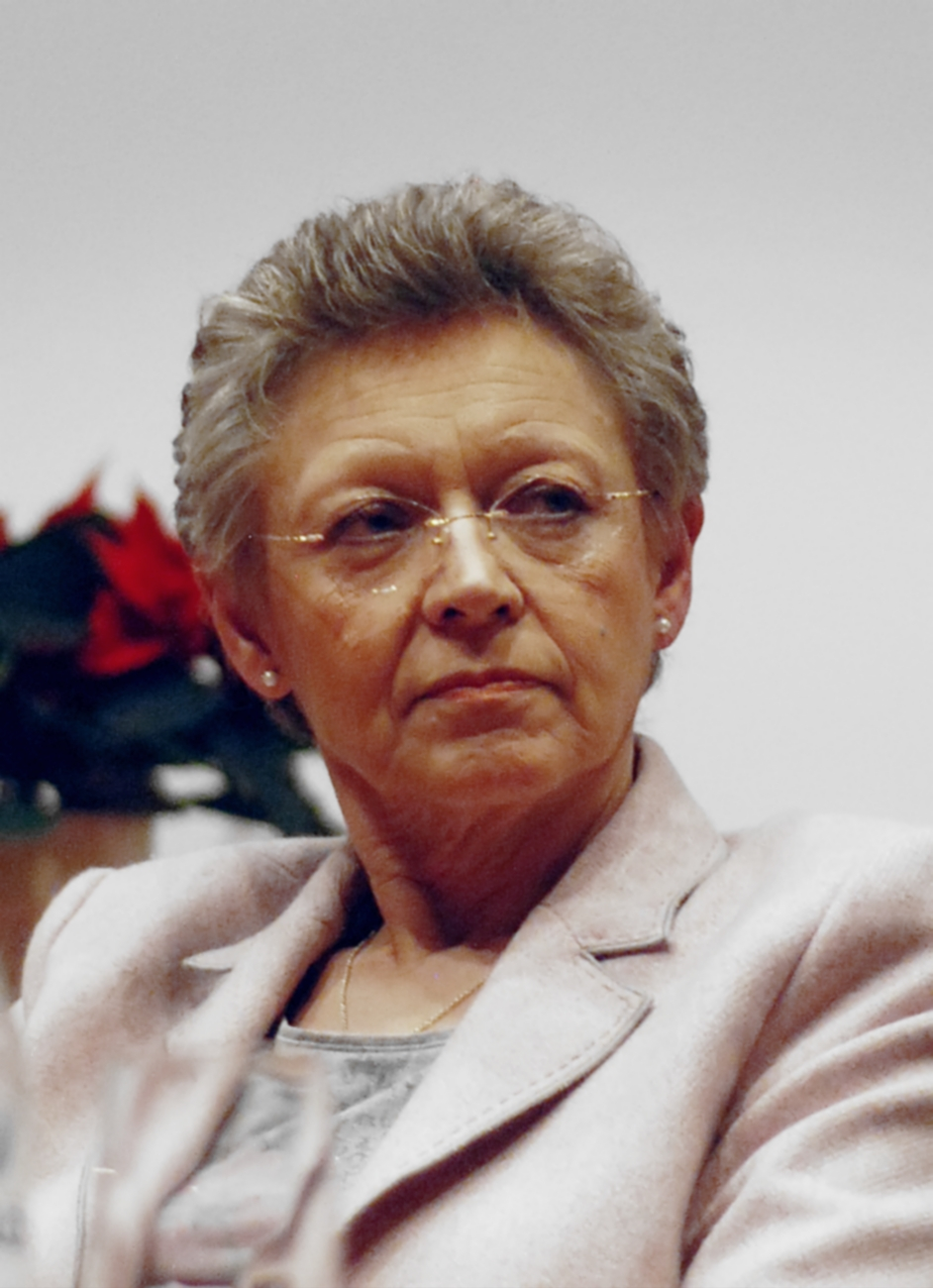
Francoise Barre-Sinoussi won the award in 2012.

- Emily Holmes
- Tracey Barett
- Nicole Soranzo
- Bianca Acevedo
- Francoise Barre-Sinoussi
- Elizabeth Murchison
- Edith Heard
- Marysia Placzek
- Sarah Teichmann
- Christiana Ruhrberg
- Georgina Ferry

=== 2011 ===
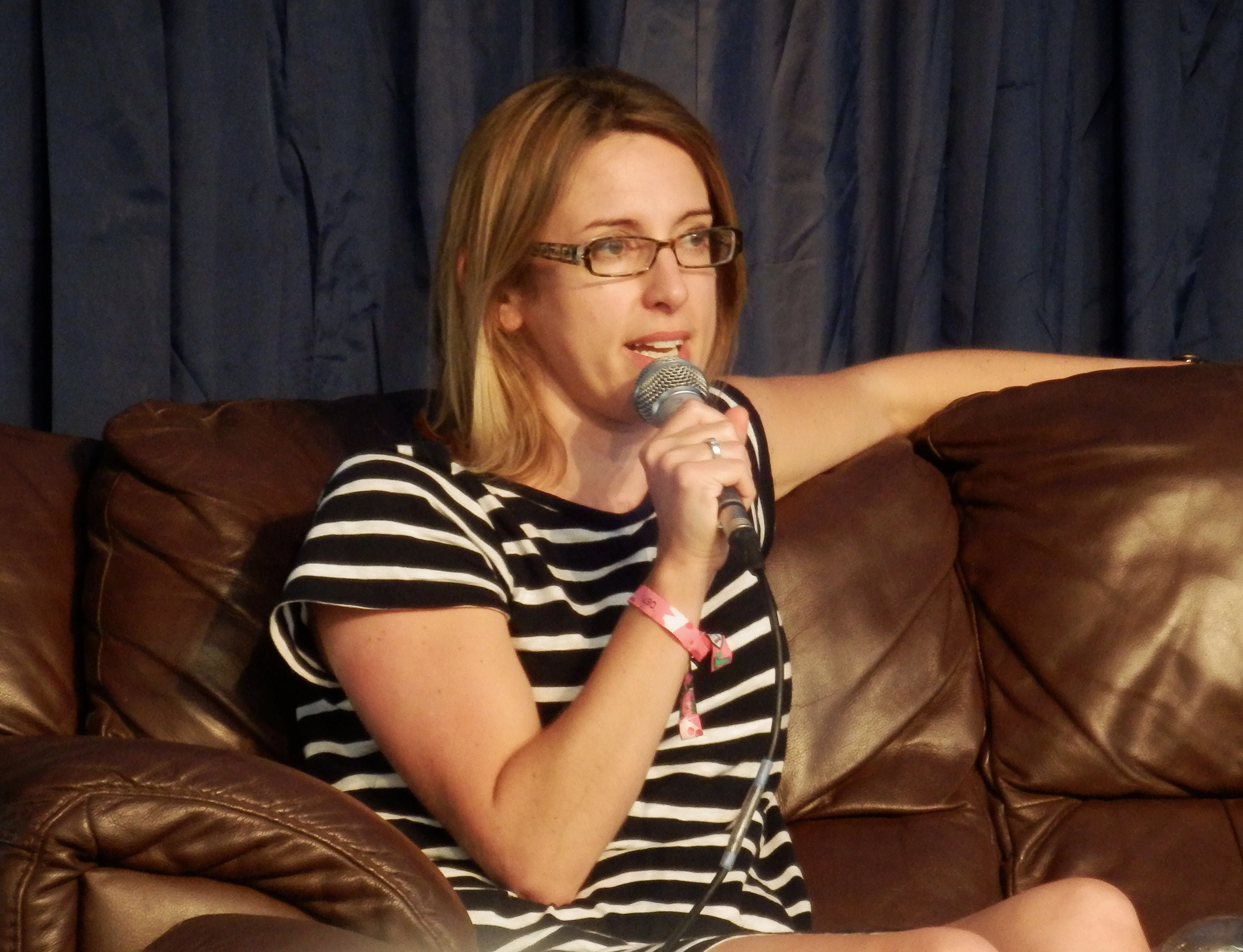
Sarah-Jayne Blakemore won the award in 2011.

- Sarah-Jayne Blakemore
- Mary Collins
- Sally Davies
- Helen Fisher
- Vivienne Parry
- Sohaila Rastan
- Elizabeth Robertson
- Janet Thornton
- Fiona Watt
- Brenda Maddox
