= Christl Donnelly =

American-British epidemiologist (born 1967)

Professor Christl Donnelly CBE FRS FMedSci
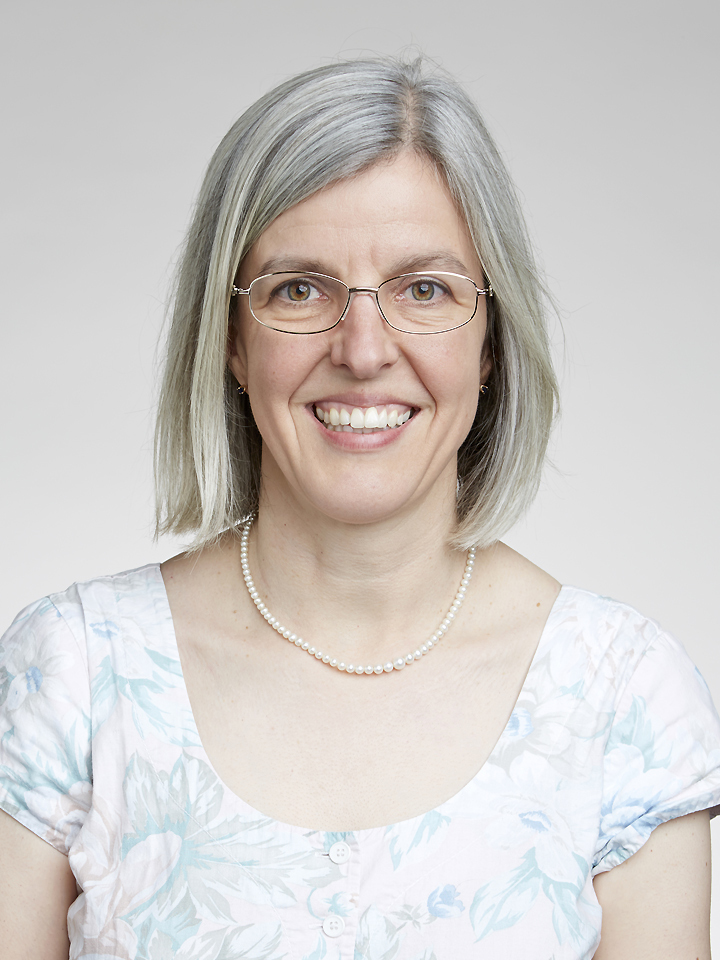
- Donnelly in 2016
- Born: 1967 (age 58–59)
- Education: Oberlin College (BA); Harvard University (MSc, SciD)
- Awards: Suffrage Science award (2016); Frink Medal (2019)
- Scientific career
- Fields: Epidemiology; Biostatistics; Infectious diseases Outbreaks; Disease control
- Workplaces: Imperial College London; University of Oxford; University of Edinburgh
- Thesis: The analysis of correlation in longitudinal and spatial data (1992)
- Doctoral advisor: Nan Laird; James H. Ware
- Website: www.imperial.ac.uk/people/c.donnelly

Christl Ann Donnelly (born 1967) is an epidemiologist who was appointed professor of applied statistics at the University of Oxford and a fellow of St Peter's College, Oxford. She is also professor of statistical epidemiology at Imperial College London. She is associate director of the MRC Centre for Global Infectious Disease Analysis. Donnelly was head of the Department of Statistics, University of Oxford from 2022 to 2025.

== Education ==
Donnelly was educated at Oberlin College in Ohio, where she was awarded a Bachelor of Arts degree in 1988, and at Harvard University in Boston where, in 1992, she was awarded Master of Science (MSc) and Doctor of Science (SciD) degrees in biostatistics supervised by Nan Laird and James H. Ware.

== Career and research ==
Donnelly's research investigates statistical and biomathematical methods to analyse epidemiological patterns of infectious diseases such as coronavirus disease 2019 (COVID-19), Influenza A virus subtype H1N1, and Severe acute respiratory syndrome (SARS), Middle East respiratory syndrome (MERS), the Ebola virus disease, zoonoses and HIV/AIDS. She has interests in ecology, conservation, and animal welfare, having worked on bovine spongiform encephalopathy (BSE) and Foot-and-mouth disease in cattle, bovine tuberculosis and policies regarding badger culling in the United Kingdom.

=== Awards and honours ===
Donnelly was elected a Fellow of the Royal Society (FRS) in 2016 and a Fellow of the Academy of Medical Sciences (FMedSci) in 2015. She was appointed Commander of the Order of the British Empire (CBE) in the 2018 New Year Honours.

In 2016 Donnelly won the Suffrage Science award, and in 2018 nominated Ruth Keogh for the award at the London School of Hygiene and Tropical Medicine (LSHTM).
