= Marysia =

Marysia is a given name. People associated with this name include:

- Marysia Zalewski, British academic
- Marysia Nikitiuk (born 1986), Ukrainian film director
- Marysia Starosta (born 1981), Polish singer
- Marysia Placzek, British neuroscientist
- Marysia Kay (born 1975), Scottish actress, singer, and fight performer
- Marysia Sadowska (born 1976), Polish pop singer, music producer, screenwriter, and film director

== See also ==
- Marysia i Napoleon, a 1966 Polish historical film
