= Mikala Egeblad =

Cancer researcher

- Education: University of Copenhagen
- Scientific career
- Thesis: ErbB receptors and ligands in breast cancer (1999)
- Doctoral advisor: Zena Werb

Mikala Egeblad is an American cancer researcher is a Bloomberg Distinguished Professor at Johns Hopkins School of Medicine. She is known for her research into cancer, and how it spreads in humans.

== Education and career ==
Egeblad attended the University of Copenhagen where she earned a bachelor's degree in medicine, a master's degree in human biology and a Ph.D. in cancer biology. Following her PhD, she trained as a postdoctoral fellow at University of California, San Francisco where she worked with Zena Werb. In 2009, she established her own lab at Cold Spring Harbor Laboratory where she worked until moving to Johns Hopkins School of Medicine as a Bloomberg Distinguished Professor in 2023.

== Research ==
Egeblad's research is centered on understanding how the body's immune response influences cancer progression, metastasis, and therapy outcomes. While at the University of California, San Francisco, Egeblad used mouse models to research the cancerous tumor microenvironment, focusing on the contribution of the innate immune system and matrix metalloproteinases. Egeblad also co-developed a technique of intravital imaging, using a 2-photon microscope and silicone window implant to capture immune cell behavior in real time.

After she moved to Cold Spring Harbor she continued to study the tumor microenvironment, foscusing on the interactions between cancer cells and their surrounding stromal cells. Her work has helped define the mechanisms by which neutrophils induce the progression of cancer and its metastasis.

== Honors and awards ==
In 2017 Egeblad received the Pershing Square Sohn Prize from the Sohn Conference Foundation. She received the Suffrage Science award from her mentor Marja Jäättelä in 2018.

== Selected publications ==
- Egeblad, Mikala; Werb, Zena (2002). "New functions for the matrix metalloproteinases in cancer progression". Nature Reviews Cancer. 2 (3): 161–174. doi:10.1038/nrc745. ISSN 1474-175X.
- Egeblad, Mikala; Nakasone, Elizabeth S.; Werb, Zena (2010). "Tumors as Organs: Complex Tissues that Interface with the Entire Organism". Developmental Cell. 18 (6): 884–901. doi:10.1016/j.devcel.2010.05.012. PMC 2905377. PMID 20627072.
- Albrengues, Jean; Shields, Mario A.; Ng, David; Park, Chun Gwon; Ambrico, Alexandra; Poindexter, Morgan E.; Upadhyay, Priya; Uyeminami, Dale L.; Pommier, Arnaud; Küttner, Victoria; Bružas, Emilis; Maiorino, Laura; Bautista, Carmelita; Carmona, Ellese M.; Gimotty, Phyllis A.; Fearon, Douglas T.; Chang, Kenneth; Lyons, Scott K.; Pinkerton, Kent E.; Trotman, Lloyd C.; Goldberg, Michael S.; Yeh, Johannes T.-H.; Egeblad, Mikala (2018-09-28). "Neutrophil extracellular traps produced during inflammation awaken dormant cancer cells in mice". Science. 361 (6409). doi:10.1126/science.aao4227. ISSN 0036-8075. PMC 6777850. PMID 30262472.
- Barnes, Betsy J.; Adrover, Jose M.; Baxter-Stoltzfus, Amelia; Borczuk, Alain; Cools-Lartigue, Jonathan; Crawford, James M.; Daßler-Plenker, Juliane; Guerci, Philippe; Huynh, Caroline; Knight, Jason S.; Loda, Massimo; Looney, Mark R.; McAllister, Florencia; Rayes, Roni; Renaud, Stephane; Rousseau, Simon; Salvatore, Steven; Schwartz, Robert E.; Spicer, Jonathan D.; Yost, Christian C.; Weber, Andrew; Zuo, Yu; Egeblad, Mikala (2020-06-01). "Targeting potential drivers of COVID-19: Neutrophil extracellular traps" (PDF). Journal of Experimental Medicine. 217 (6). doi:10.1084/jem.20200652. ISSN 0022-1007. PMC 7161085. PMID 32302401.
