= Sara Lombardo =

Italian applied mathematician

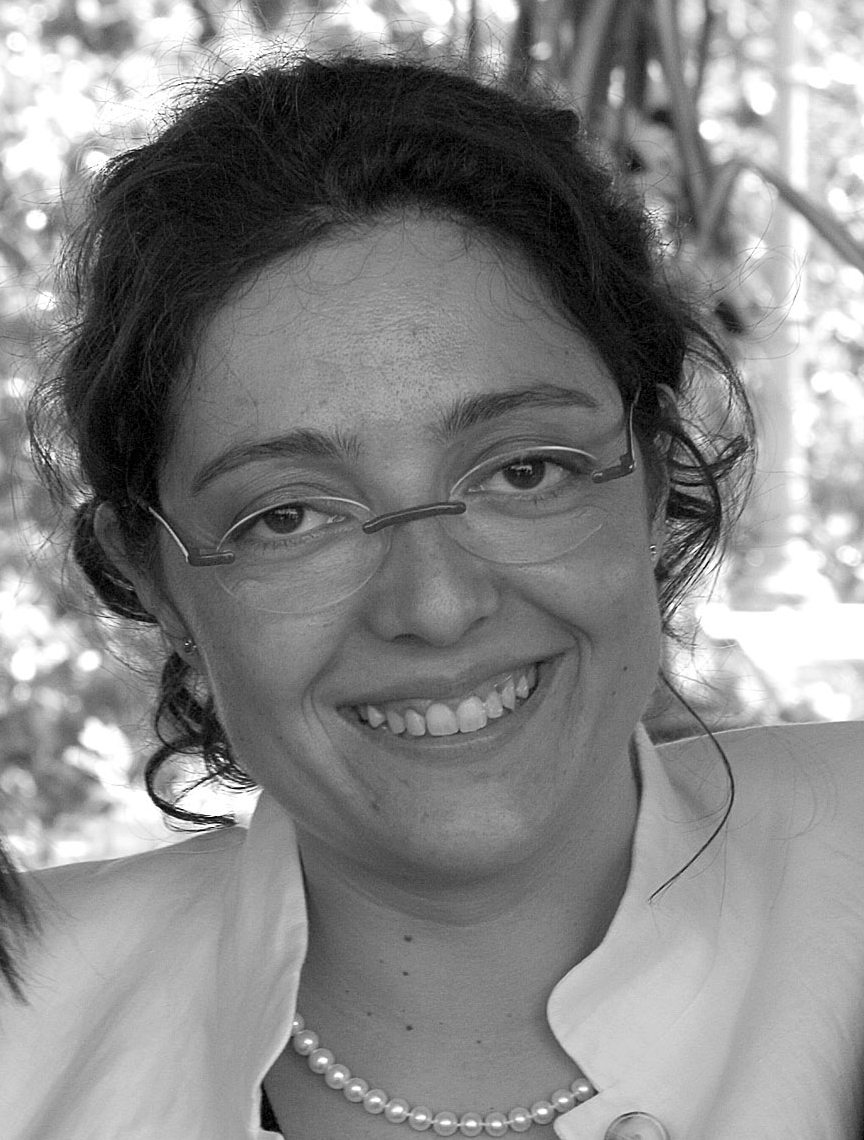
Lombardo in 2007

Sara Lombardo is an Italian applied mathematician whose research topics include nonlinear dynamics, rogue waves and solitons, integrable systems, and automorphic Lie algebras. She is Executive Dean of the School of Mathematical & Computer Sciences at Heriot-Watt University. Previously she was professor of mathematics at Loughborough University, and associate dean with teaching responsibilities.

== Education and career ==
Lombardo studied mathematical physics at Sapienza University of Rome, earning a laurea in physics in 2000. She completed her PhD at the University of Leeds in 2004; her dissertation, Reductions of integrable equations and automorphic Lie algebras, was supervised by Alexander V. Mikhailov.

After postdoctoral research positions at the University of Leeds, University of Kent, Manchester University, and Vrije Universiteit Amsterdam, she joined the academic staff at Northumbria University in 2011, becoming head of mathematics there. She moved to Loughborough University in 2017 and to Heriot-Watt in 2022.

== Recognition ==
Lombardo is a Fellow of the Higher Education Academy and a Fellow of the Institute of Mathematics and its Applications. She was one of the 2020 winners of the Suffrage Science award in maths and computing.
