= Ascona B-DNA Consortium =

International DNA consortium

The Ascona B-DNA Consortium (ABC) is a collaborative international research initiative founded in 2001 to investigate the sequence-dependent mechanical properties of DNA using molecular dynamics (MD) simulations. The consortium has contributed significantly to the understanding of DNA structure and dynamics over the past two decades, from the atomic level to larger chromatin structures. The ABC's work includes the development of simulation standards, force fields, and data libraries for DNA, enabling the systematic study of sequence effects across different nucleotide configurations.

== History ==
The ABC was founded in 2001 during an informal meeting led by a group of scientist that was attending to the "Atomistic to Continuum Models for Long Molecules" conference in Ascona, Switzerland. The consortium started by joining efforts from nine laboratories with expertise in DNA molecular dynamics and sequence-dependent DNA effects. The initial aim was to conduct state-of-the-art MD simulations to establish standards for DNA modeling and to analyze the effects of sequence on DNA's structure and flexibility.

=== Phase I and II ===
In its initial phase, known as Phase I (2004–2005), the ABC conducted 15-nanosecond simulations of 10 different 15-mer DNA sequences using the parm94 force field. This study, which analyzed sequence effects at the dinucleotide level, marked the first systematic approach to DNA simulation in the field.

Following improvements in force fields, the consortium launched Phase II between 2007 and 2009, re-running the initial simulations using the parmbsc0 force field (developed at the Barcelona Supercomputing Center) and extending simulation times to 50 nanoseconds for a set of 39 DNA sequences. This phase allowed the first comprehensive study of all 136 unique tetranucleotide combinations.

=== μABC, miniABC, and hexABC ===
To address limitations in simulation times, the μABC project (2010–2014) pushed simulations into the microsecond range with 39 B-DNA 18-mer sequences containing at least 3 copies of all the unique tetranucleotides, facilitating studies of convergence. Results from this study were key in leading to the creation of the parmbsc1 force field, a state-of-the-art set of parameters for the simulation of DNA alone or in complex with other biomolecules. Using this refined force field a project known as miniABC, involved simulations of a minimal library of 13 B-DNA sequences under diverse salt conditions, which enabled further analysis of tetranucleotides and allowed the extension and refinement of Calladine–Dickerson rules including subtle conformational polymorphisms of DNA structure.

Currently, the hexABC project seeks to advance DNA conformational studies by simulating 950 20-mer sequences over the sub-millisecond timescale. This project aims to investigate the effects of next-to-nearest neighbor interactions, covering all 2080 unique hexanucleotide combinations with the latest force fields parmbsc1 and OL15. HexABC is the joint effort of 14 research institutions: EPFL Lausanne, Kaunas University of Technology, Gdańsk University of Technology, IRB Barcelona, Jülich Supercomputing Center, Louisiana Tech University, University of Cambridge, University of Florida, University of Leeds, University of Nottingham, University of the Republic of Uruguay, University of Utah, University of York and ENS Paris-Saclay.

== 2023 meeting ==
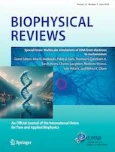
Special issue devoted to the 2023 ABC meeting

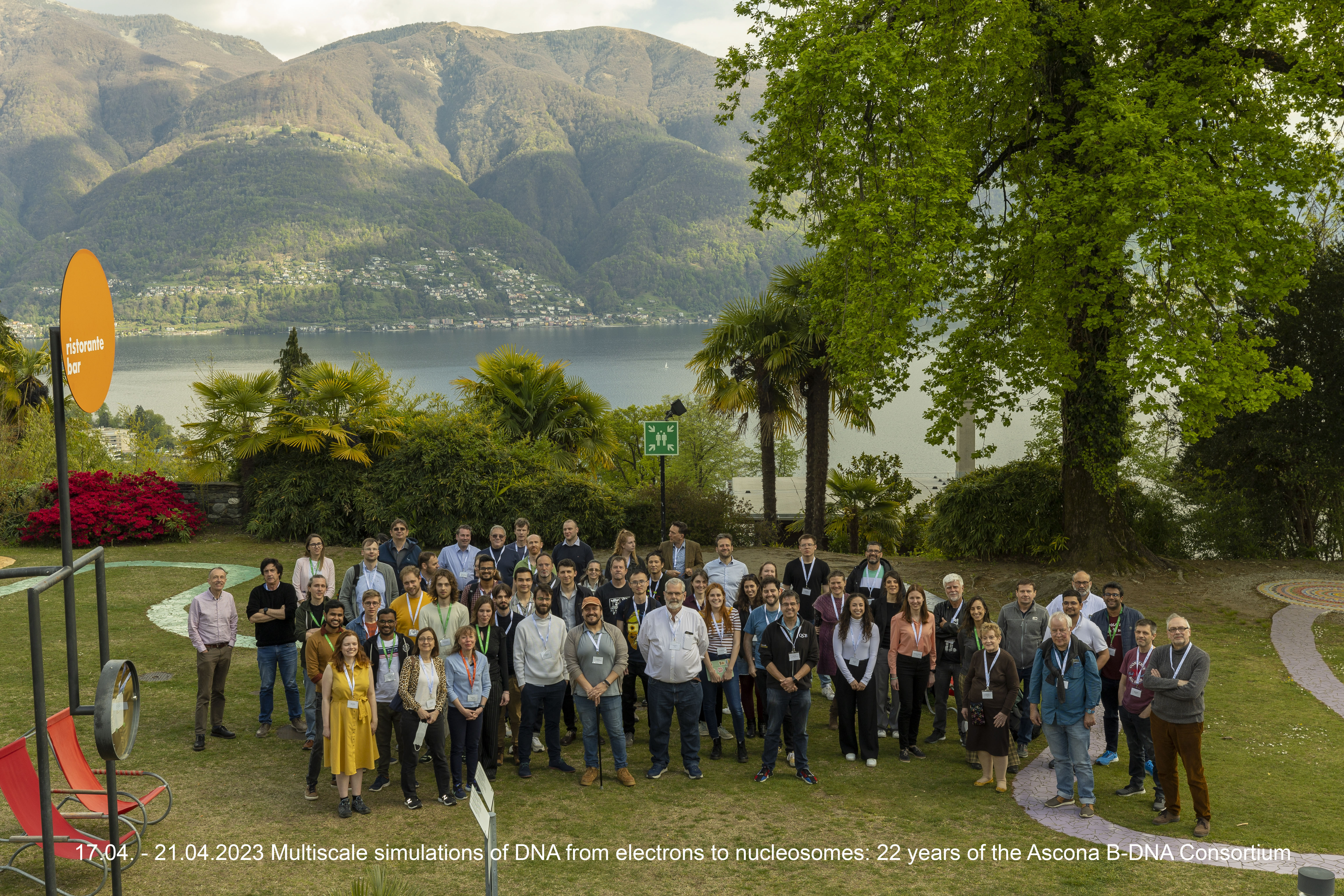
Participants of the ABC meeting held in Ascona (Switzerland) from 17-21 April 2023.

In April 2023, the ABC celebrated its 22nd anniversary by hosting a conference back in Ascona, Switzerland. This event brought together consortium members and collaborators to discuss recent theoretical and experimental developments in DNA structure and dynamics, including sequence effects on DNA interactions within chromatin.

The conference, funded by the Centre Européen de Calcul Atomique et Moléculaire and the Congressi Stefano Francini, featured three keynote presentations, 39 oral communications, and two poster sessions.

A special issue of the Biophysical Reviews journal edited by Prof Wilma Olson and published by Springer Nature was devoted to some of the studies presented at the conference.

== Current members ==
The current members of the ABC consortium, as of 2024, are active contributors to the consortium's ongoing projects:

- EPFL Lausanne - John Maddocks, Rahul Sharma
- Kaunas University of Technology - Daiva Petkevičiūtė-Gerlach
- Gdańsk University of Technology - Jacek Czub
- IRB Barcelona - Modesto Orozco, Juan Pablo Arcón, Federica Battistini, Adam Hospital, Genís Bayarri, Subhamoy Deb, Milosz Wieczo
- Jülich Supercomputing Center - Paolo Carloni, Katya Ahmad
- Louisiana Tech University - Thomas Bishop, Ran Sun
- University of Cambridge - Rosana Collepardo, Jorge R. Espinosa
- University of Florida - Alberto Pérez
- University of Leeds - Sarah A. Harris
- University of Nottingham - Charles A. Laughton
- University of the Republic of Uruguay - Pablo D. Dans, Gabriela da Rosa
- University of Utah - Thomas Cheatham III, Rodrigo Galindo-Murillo
- University of York - Agnes Noy
- ENS Paris-Saclay - Marco Pasi
