= Daniela De Angelis =

Italian biostatistician

- Occupation: Biostatistician
- Known for: Infectious disease modelling
- Scientific career
- Workplaces: Medical Research Council University of Cambridge

Daniela De Angelis MBE is an Italian biostatistician specializing in infectious disease modelling. Her current roles are Professor of Statistical Science for Health at the University of Cambridge in the Department of Primary Care and Public Health and Deputy Director and Programme Leader at the Medical Research Council Biostatistics Unit. She has published research on the development and application of statistical methods to monitor infectious diseases such as SARS COVID-19, influenza, HIV and hepatitis C. De Angelis is a member of scientific advisory groups such as NICE, WHO, and UNAIDS. She is a member of SPI-M (Scientific Pandemic Influenza Advisory Committee, subgroup on Modelling) and the Royal Statistical Society Task Force for COVID-19. In 2022, she was awarded an Honorary MBE for her services to Medical Research and Public Health.

== Career history ==
In 2017, the Infected Blood Inquiry was launched. De Angelis is a member of the Statistics Expert Group as part of this inquiry.

In 2019, De Angelis was appointed Professor of Statistical Science for Health at the University of Cambridge.

== Research ==
=== HIV ===
In HIV modelling, De Angelis was the senior author of a study that projected that England would diagnose 95% of people living with HIV by 2025. This is one of three aspects of UNAIDS' 90-90-90 goal: to have 90% of people with HIV diagnosed, 90% of people diagnosed with HIV receiving antiretroviral therapy and 90% of people receiving this therapy having viral suppression.

=== COVID-19 ===
De Angelis was the senior statistician for the MRC Biostatistics Unit's "nowcasting" and forecasting of COVID-19 data: using statistical modelling to estimate current (and predict future) numbers of infections, R_{t}, numbers of hospital admissions and more, by age and region in England. This information was provided directly to the SAGE sub-group, SPI-M and to regional teams at the UK Health Security Agency (UKHSA).

== Recognition ==
In 2018, De Angelis received the Suffrage Science Award in Maths & Computing.

In 2021, she received the University of Cambridge Vice-Chancellor's Established Academic Award for her work on real-time monitoring of the SARS-COV2 pandemic.

In 2022, De Angelis was awarded an honorary MBE for services to medical research and public health. That same year, she also received the Weldon Memorial Prize as a member of the Scientific Pandemic Influenza Group on Modelling, Operational sub-group (SPI-M-O).

== See also ==
- Medical Research Council
