= Pippa Goldschmidt =

British astronomer and writer

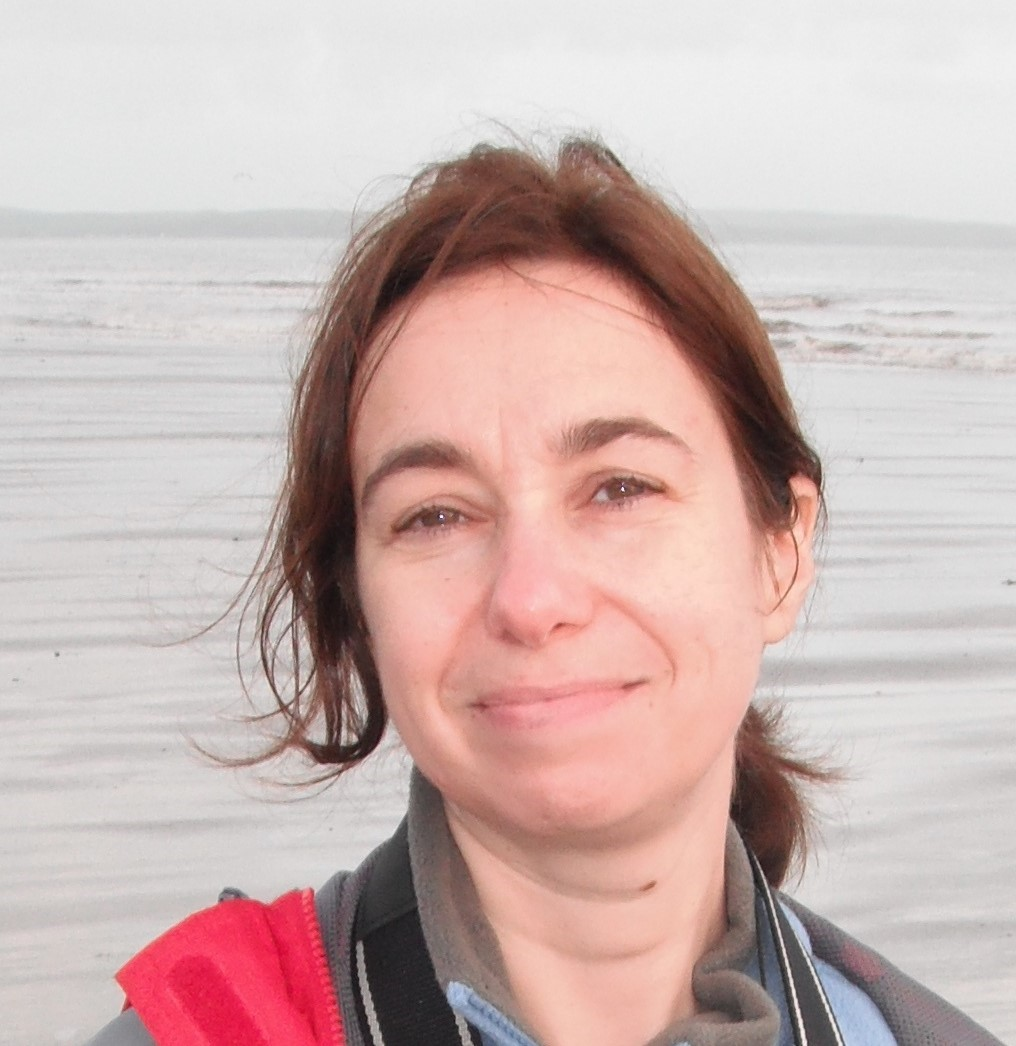
- Education: University of Leeds (BSc); University of Edinburgh (PhD); University of Glasgow (MLitt)
- Occupation: Writer
- Awards: Suffrage Science Award (2016)
- Scientific career
- Fields: Physics, astronomy
- Workplaces: Imperial College London; Queen Mary University
- Writing career
- Language: English
- Notable works: The Falling Sky (2015); The Need for Better Regulation of Outer Space (2015); I Am Because You Are (2015)
- Website: www.pippagoldschmidt.co.uk

Pippa Goldschmidt is a British fiction writer, formerly based in Edinburgh, Scotland but now living in Germany.

== Education ==
Goldschmidt has a background in science, having completed an undergraduate degree in physics with astronomy at the University of Leeds and a PhD in Astronomy at University of Edinburgh.

== Career ==
After completing her education she worked as a postdoctoral researcher at Queen Mary University and Imperial College in London, then joined the civil service fast stream graduate scheme, working at British National Space Centre and Department for Trade and Industry. During her work in government she worked on homelessness policy for the Scottish Government, as well as offshore renewable energy policy for Marine Scotland.

=== Writing ===
Goldschmidt's debut novel Falling Sky was published in 2013 and a collection of short stories The Need for Better Regulation of Outer Space in 2015. In 2015 she was the co-editor of I Am Because You Are, a collection of short stories on the theme of relativity, published for the centenary of Einstein's theory of general relativity. She has also been a writer in residence for the ESRC Genomics Policy and Research Forum, the School of Physics and Astronomy at the University of Edinburgh, Wigtown Book Festival, the German city of Heidelberg and is currently writer in residence at the University of Edinburgh's science, technology and innovation studies unit.

In 2008 she achieved an MLitt in Creative Writing from the University of Glasgow.

=== Publications ===
- The Falling Sky (2013) ISBN 978-1908754141
- The Need for Better Regulation of Outer Space (2015)
- I Am Because You Are (2015)

=== Awards and honours ===
- The Falling Sky Shortlisted for Dundee International Book Prize (2012)
- Scottish Book Trust New Writers Award (2012)
- Suffrage Science award (2016)
- Longlisted for the Edge Hill Short Story Prize (2016)
- Longlisted for the Frank O'Connor International Short Story Award (2015)
