= Sarah Harris (scientist) =

British physicist

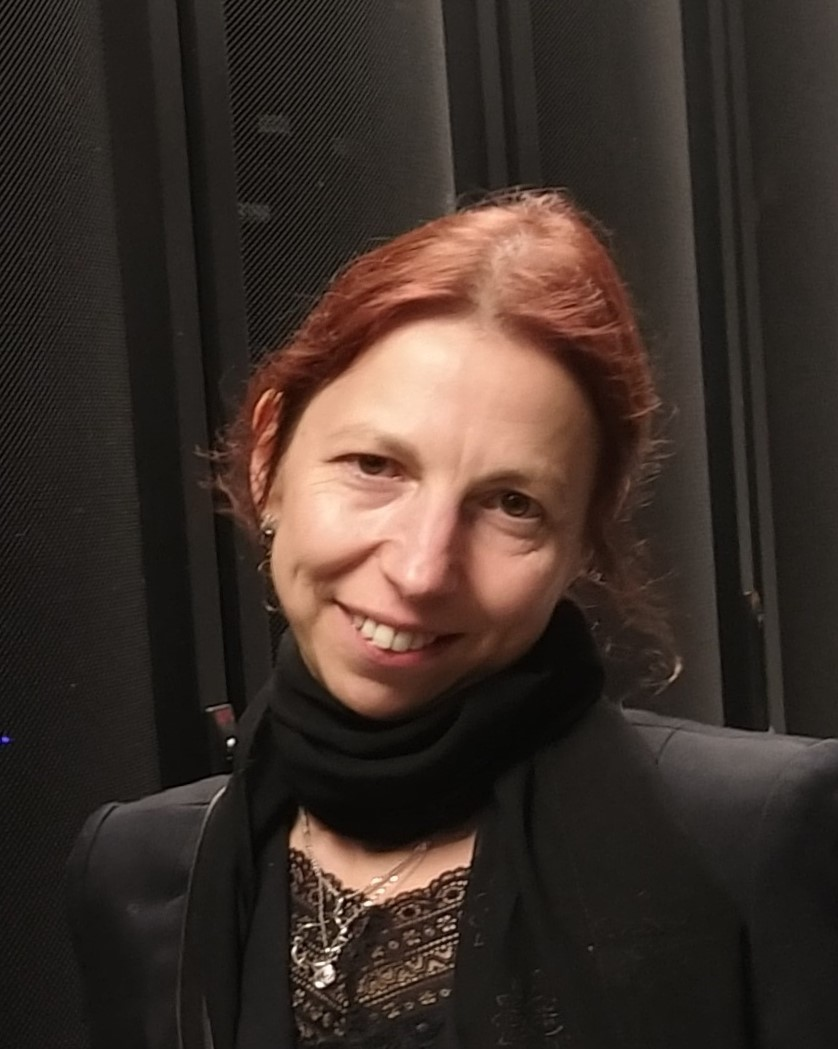
- Born: Sarah Anne Harris
- Education: University of Oxford (BA); University of Nottingham (PhD)
- Awards: Suffrage Science award (2019)
- Scientific career
- Fields: Biological physics Molecular simulation
- Workplaces: University College London; University of Leeds; University of Sheffield
- Thesis: Theoretical investigations of DNA structure and dynamics (2001)
- Website: astbury.leeds.ac.uk/people/dr-sarah-harris/

Sarah Anne Harris is a British physicist who is an Associate Professor of Biological Physics at the University of Leeds and Professor of Biological Physics at the University of Sheffield. Her research investigates biomolecular simulations and the topology of DNA. In particular, she makes use of molecular dynamics to explore how DNA responds to stress. She serves as chair of the Engineering and Physical Sciences Research Council (EPSRC) computational collaborative project in Biomolecular simulation.

== Early life and education ==
Harris was an undergraduate student in physics at the University of Oxford. She was a graduate student at the University of Nottingham where she studied the structure and dynamics of DNA.

== Research and career ==
Harris joined University College London where she worked on condensed matter physics. She joined the faculty at the University of Leeds in 2004, where she holds a joint position at the Astbury Centre for Structural and Molecular Biology. Her research considers the development of theoretical and computational biophysical tools to address open questions in molecular biophysics. Circular DNA sequences are present in bacterial, mitochondrial and cancer genomes, and offer promise for the design of gene vectors. These circular sequences can withstand superhelical stresses, resulting in the formation of DNA supercoils. Whilst such supercoils are frequently observed in vivo, their closed topology renders them more challenging to study experimentally than their linear counterparts. To this end, minicircles of DNA (closed double-stranded DNA sequences) have been proposed as model systems. Harris developed the mathematical models and atomistic molecular dynamics simulations that can accurately describe these DNA supercoils. Harris was involved with the development of Fluctuating Finite Element Analysis, a mesoscale modelling tool that makes use of continuum mechanics used to predict bimolecular dynamics in globular macromolecules and proteins. FFEA makes use of 3D volumetric information, such as Cryo Electron Tomography maps.

In 2020, Harris was appointed chair of the Engineering and Physical Sciences Research Council (EPSRC) computational collaborative project in Biomolecular simulation. The project unites biochemists, biophysicists and computer scientists in an effort to better understand biomolecular processes. These include simulations that can describe the role of enzymes in biological reactions, the configuration of proteins in cell membranes and the design of effective pharmaceutical. She serves on the management committee of High-End Computing Resources by the Biomolecular Simulation Community (HECBioSim), which provides access to High performance computing capabilities to scientists working on biomedical challenges.

Alongside the scientific insights that can be gained from biophysical simulations, Harris is interested in the artistic outputs of theoretical biology. She published a collection of images that were generated during theoretical biology.

=== Selected publications ===
Her publications include:

- Parmbsc1: a refined force field for DNA simulations
- Cooperativity in drug-DNA recognition: a molecular dynamics study
- Structural diversity of supercoiled DNA

=== Awards and honours ===
She won the Suffrage Science award in 2019.

== See also ==
- Ascona B-DNA Consortium
