= Rebecca DerSimonian =

American statistician

Rebecca R. DerSimonian is an American statistician, known for her work with Nan Laird introducing the random-effects model for meta-analysis and, in their 1986 paper "Meta-analysis in clinical trials" applying meta-analysis to clinical trials. She is a biostatistician in the National Institutes of Health.

DerSimonian graduated in 1974 from Brandeis University, and earned a Ph.D. in 1983 at Harvard University. At the National Institutes of Health, she has also been active in supporting women researchers, as a member of its Women Scientist Advisors Committee and as an organizer of communications workshops for women.

In 1988, as an assistant professor at Yale University, and again in 1993–1994, as a researcher with the National Institutes of Health, she visited Armenia for four months each as a Fulbright Scholar. In 2017 she was elected as a Fellow of the American Statistical Association.
