= Claudia Mazzà =

Professor of biomechanics

- Education: University of Bologna
- Scientific career
- Fields: Bioengineering
- Workplaces: University of Sheffield
- Thesis: (2004)
- Website: at sheffield.ac.uk

Claudia Mazzà is a professor of biomechanics at the Department of Mechanical Engineering at the University of Sheffield. Her research centres on biomechanics of human movement. She is the director of the EPSRC funded MultiSim project and a leading scientist in the Mobilise-D research project.

== Education and career ==
Mazzà studied biomechanics at the University of Bologna where she completed her PhD in 2004. She then continued her research at the Department of Human Movement Sciences at the Foro Italico University of Rome where she was appointed assistant professor in 2006. She became a reader in Sheffield in 2013 and was promoted to professor in 2019.

== Research ==
Mazzà's research encompasses a range of topics including biomechanics, gait analysis, techniques for human movement analysis and musculoskeletal modelling. This includes work on the influence of certain illnesses such as Parkinson's disease on the posture and motion of patients.

== Awards and honours ==
- Life Sciences Award – Suffrage Science awards 2020
