= Corinne Houart =

Biomedical scientist and academic

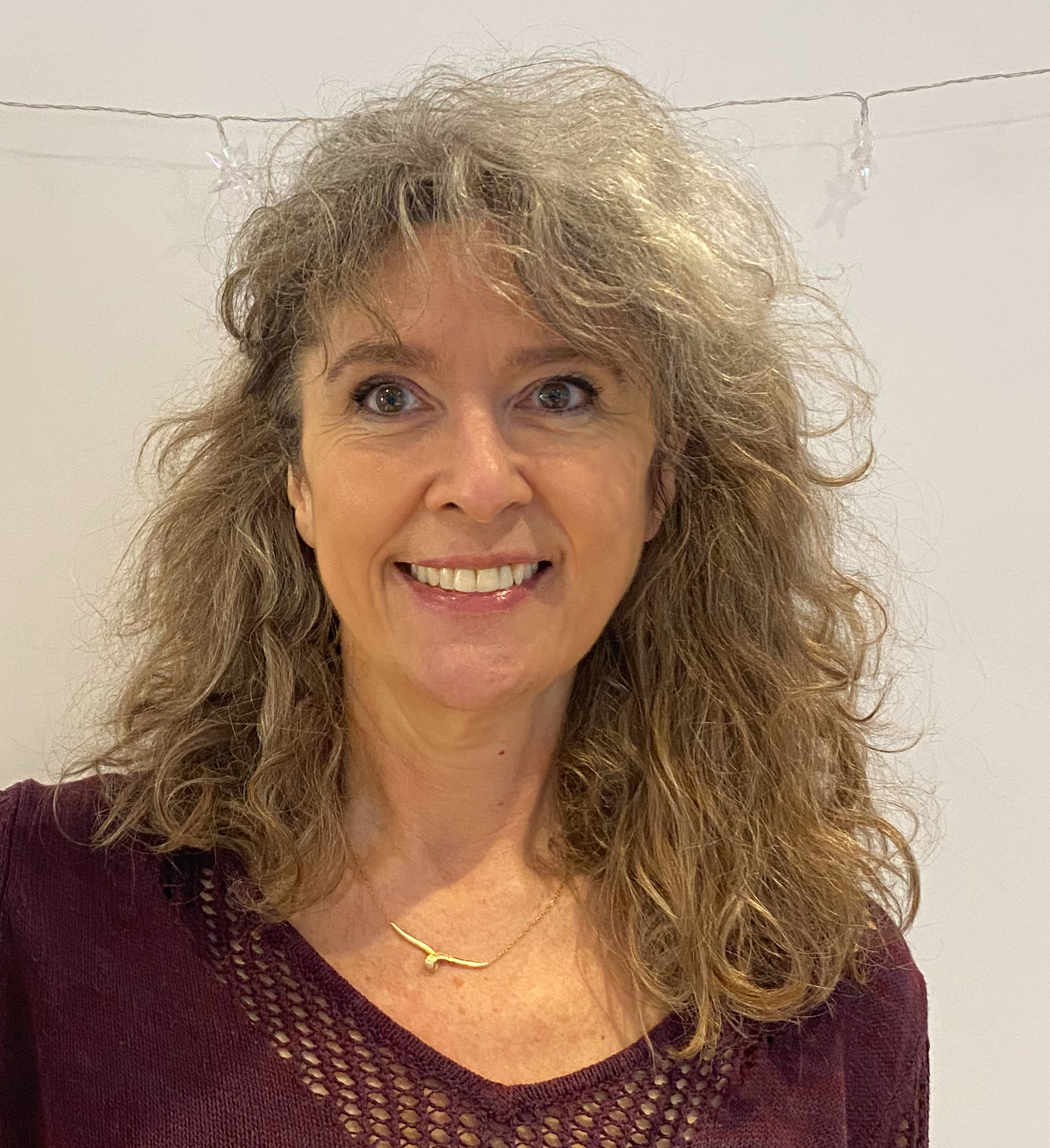
Houart pictured in 2020

Corinne Houart is a Belgian biomedical scientist who is Professor of Developmental Neurobiology at King's College London. She also serves as Vice Dean for Research in the Institute of Psychiatry, Psychology, and Neuroscience at King's College London. She is a leading international researcher with a focus on the molecular and cellular mechanisms that drive zebrafish forebrain development, and evolutionary mechanisms underlying vertebrate brain regionalisation.

== Early life and education ==
Corinne Houart completed her secondary education in a comprehensive school in the north of Brussels. She studied biomedical sciences at the Université libre de Bruxelles and remained there for doctoral research, where she studied gene regulation in cancer. After her PhD and a career break in Mexico, Houart moved to the University of Oregon, where she began working on developmental neuroscience and established that the anterior neural border and the Wnt/beta-catenin pathway are critical for forebrain regionalisation and showed that forebrain specification took place at the neural plate stage.

== Research and career ==
Houart started her independent laboratory at King's College London in 2001, and was promoted to professor in 2008. She leads a pioneering lab focused on understanding the molecular and cellular foundations of early brain development. Over her career, she has expanded her research scope to include studies on RNA splicing and neurodegeneration, with particular interest in proteins like SFPQ that influence axonal development and are implicated in conditions like ALS. Houart's lab has become a leader in using the zebrafish as a model organism to examine how signalling pathways and transcription factors shape brain architecture in the early stages of development.

A significant area of Houart's more recent research at King's has focused on the transcription factor FOXG1, which plays a pivotal role in forebrain organisation. Her work has shed light on how human mutations in FOXG1 impact brain formation, with implications for conditions like FOXG1 syndrome and autism spectrum conditions. Her lab has successfully created zebrafish models that help elucidate the gene's function and the developmental impact of its human mutations, providing a basis for potential therapeutic approaches. Houart has been instrumental in advancing genome editing techniques, enabling more refined investigations into brain development processes.

In recognition of her scientific achievements, Corinne Houart was elected to the European Molecular Biology Organisation (EMBO) in 2021. She has also received the Medical Research Council's Suffrage Science award, which honours leading female scientists for their contributions and role as mentors in science.

== Notable publications ==
- Taylor, R., Hamid, F., Fielding, T., Makeyev, E.V., Houart, C., 2022. Prematurely terminated intron-retaining mRNAs invade axons in SFPQ null-driven neurodegeneration and are a hallmark of ALS. Nature Communications, 13(1), p.6994.
- Johansson, M., Giger, F.A., Fielding, T., Houart, C., 2019. Dkk1 Controls Cell-Cell Interaction through Regulation of Non-nuclear β-Catenin Pools. Developmental Cell, 51(6), pp.775–786.e3.
- Nikolaou, N., Gordon, P.M., Hamid, F., Makeyev, E.V., Houart, C., 2022. Cytoplasmic pool of U1 spliceosome protein SNRNP70 shapes the axonal transcriptome and regulates motor connectivity. Current Biology, 32(23), pp.5099–5115.e8.
- Thomas-Jinu, S., Gordon, P.M., Fielding, T., Shaw, C.E., Houart, C., 2017. Non-nuclear Pool of Splicing Factor SFPQ Regulates Axonal Transcripts Required for Normal Motor Development. Neuron, 94(2), pp.322–336.e5.
- Fassier, C., Hutt, J.A., Scholpp, S., Houart, C., Hazan, J., 2010. Zebrafish atlastin controls motility and spinal motor axon architecture via inhibition of the BMP pathway. Nature Neuroscience, 13(11), pp.1380–1387.
- Danesin, C., Peres, J.N., Johansson, M., Papalopulu, N., Houart, C., 2009. Integration of Telencephalic Wnt and Hedgehog Signaling Center Activities by Foxg1. Developmental Cell, 16(4), pp.576–587.
- Caneparo, L., Huang, Y.-L., Staudt, N., Niehrs, C., Houart, C., 2007. Dickkopf-1 regulates gastrulation movements by coordinated modulation of Wnt/β-catenin and Wnt/PCP activities, through interaction with the Dally-like homolog Knypek. Genes and Development, 21(4), pp.465–480.
- Wilson, S.W. & Houart, C., 2004. Early steps in the development of the forebrain. Developmental Cell, 6(2), pp.167–181. doi:10.1016/S1534-5807(04)00027-9.
- Houart, C., Westerfield, M. & Wilson, S.W., 1998. A small population of anterior cells patterns the forebrain during zebrafish gastrulation. Nature, 391(6669), pp.788–792.
