= Samaya Nissanke =

Astrophysicist

- Education: Westminster School
- Alma mater: University of Cambridge; Institut d'astrophysique de Paris
- Awards: Special Breakthrough Prize in Fundamental Physics (2016); Gruber Prize in Cosmology (2016); The Breakthrough Foundation New Horizons in Physics Prize (2020); Suffrage Science award (2021); 2024 Jacques Solvay Chair in Physics (2023); American Astronomical Society HEAD 2024 mid-career prize (2024)
- Scientific career
- Workplaces: Canadian Institute for Theoretical Astrophysics; California Institute of Technology; Radboud University Nijmegen; University of Amsterdam; Nikhef; University of Potsdam; DESY; German Centre for Astrophysics
- Thesis: Aspects théoriques de la forme des ondes gravitationnelles pour les phases spiralante et de fusion des systèmes binaires compacts (2007)

Samaya Michiko Nissanke is a British astrophysicist, leading scientist at DESY and the German Centre for Astrophysics, and professor of multi-messenger astrophysics at the University of Potsdam. She was previously an associate professor in gravitational wave and multi-messenger astrophysics and the spokesperson for the GRAPPA Centre for Excellence in Gravitation and Astroparticle Physics at the University of Amsterdam. She works on gravitational-wave astrophysics and has played a founding role in the emerging field of multi-messenger astronomy. She played a leading role in the discovery paper of the first binary neutron star merger, GW170817, seen in gravitational waves and electromagnetic radiation.

In 2020, she was awarded the New Horizons in Physics Prize from the Breakthrough Prize Foundation with Jo Dunkley and Kendrick Smith for "the development of novel techniques to extract fundamental physics from astronomical data". She was awarded the 2021 Suffrage Award Award for Engineering and Physical Sciences for "outstanding science, science communication and support for women in STEM," nominated by Prof. Amina Helmi of the University of Groningen. In 2023, she was made the 2024 Jacques Solvay Chair in Physics. In 2024, Nissanke was awarded the American Astronomical Society’s High Energy Astrophysics Division 2024 mid-career prize.

== Early life and education ==
Nissanke was born in London to a Japanese mother and a Sri Lankan father. She completed her bachelor's and master's degrees in the Natural Sciences Tripos (Physics) at the University of Cambridge. She then joined the Paris Observatory for her postgraduate studies. Nissanke earned her PhD in analytical relativity at the Institut d'astrophysique de Paris in 2007 with a thesis titled Aspects théoriques de la forme des ondes gravitationnelles pour les phases spiralante et de fusion des systèmes binaires compacts (Theoretical aspects of the shape of gravitational waves for the spiraling and merging phases of compact binary systems).

== Research ==
Nissanke completed her postdoctoral research at the Canadian Institute for Theoretical Astrophysics, the Jet Propulsion Lab, California Institute of Technology and Radboud University Nijmegen working on gravitational wave and electromagnetic emission from compact object mergers since 2007. She is a member of the Virgo collaboration and works with the BlackGEM, VLA, MeerKAT and LOFAR telescopes and was part of the group that discovered the radio counterpart to GW170817. She demonstrated it was possible to determine the Hubble constant using gravitational wave observations from merging neutron star binaries and how to identify the elusive electromagnetic counterparts of gravitational wave mergers.

Nissanke was working at Radboud as the group leader for the gravitational wave group when the first detection of gravitational waves was confirmed. In 2016 she was awarded Netherlands Organisation for Scientific Research (NWO) TOP and VIDI grants to study the birth of black holes and neutron star mergers. In 2018 she joined the faculty at the Gravitational AstroParticle Physics Amsterdam (GRAPPA) Institute at the University of Amsterdam. She is the Astrophysics Working Group Chair of a European Cooperation in Science and Technology Action on Gravitational Waves. She founded and chaired the Netherlands Astronomy Equity and Inclusion Committee (2019-2025) and is a strong advocate for inclusive astronomy. In 2025, Nissanke is a leading scientist at DESY, the German Centre for Astrophysics (DZA) and a professor in multi-messenger astrophysics at the University of Potsdam in Germany.

=== Public engagement ===
Nissanke is a popular science communicator and has been interviewed by Scientific American, New Scientist, Nature, Vox Media, BBC Radio 4, BBC World Service and Die Zeit. She represented the Virgo Collaboration at the European Southern Observatory press conference in 2017, for the announcement of a merger of neutron stars. Before the detection of gravitational waves, Nissanke joined composer Arthur Jeffes at the Marshmallow Laser Feast to create a piece of music about merging neutron stars and black holes billions of years ago.

=== Awards and honours ===
As part of the LIGO Scientific and Virgo Collaborations, Nissanke was awarded the Special Breakthrough Prize in Fundamental Physics (2016) and the Gruber Prize in Cosmology (2016). In 2019, it was announced that Nissanke would receive the 2020 New Horizons in Physics Prize with Jo Dunkley and Kendrick Smith from the Breakthrough Prize Foundation. In 2021 Nissanke received a Suffrage Science award, nominated by Amina Helmi. In 2023, she was awarded the 2024 Jacques Solvay Chair in Physics and the distinguished Helmholtz chair. In 2024, the American Astronomical Society’s High Energy Astrophysics Division awarded Nissanke with its 2024 mid-career prize.
