= Eileen Ingham =

British immunologist

- Spouse: John Fisher

Academic background
- Education: Leeds University

Academic work
- Discipline: Immunology
- Sub-discipline: Biocompatibility in medical implants
- Institutions: Leeds University

Eileen Ingham is a multidisciplinary scientist specialising in biochemistry, microbiology, clinical immunology and pathogenesis. She is most recognized for her work and contribution to biocompatibility in medical implants. She is currently a professor at the University of Leeds as of 2016 when she was elected as Professor for Medical Immunology.

== Early career ==
Eileen Ingham graduated from Leeds University in 1975 graduating in Biochemistry and Microbiology. Four years later she followed up her undergraduate degree with a PhD in 1979 studying Clinical Immunology; whilst doing her postdoctoral training at Leeds General Infirmary.

== Professional work ==
Ingham has written and published 300 peer-reviewed journals and 20 invited international journal reviews. With her work being cited over 11,000 times with a H-factors of 58.

She founded the Medical and Biological Engineering Institute at the University of Leeds.

In 2011 she was awarded the title of Woman of Outstanding Achievement in Innovation and Entrepreneurship in Academia and Research, by the UK Women Resource Centre for Women in Science, Engineering and technology.

For over 20 years she’s worked closely with John Fisher (her husband) to develop the technique of decellularisation — a technique where DNA and cells are washed out of tissue, so the body does not reject them after a transplant. They were finalists for BBSRC Innovator of the Year Award 2009 and the European Inventor Award 2018 (Research Category).

Ingham was elected a Fellow of the Academy of Medical Sciences in 2016.

== Patents ==
Ingham has received seven patents;

1. Decellularisation of matrices (2009).
2. Beta-sheet forming peptides and material made thereof, (2002).
3. Ultrasonic modification of soft tissue matrices, (2007).
4. Improvements relating to decellularisation of tissue matrices for bladder implantation, (2007).
5. Acellular vascular products, (2017).
6. Composite bone implant, (2017).
7. Preparation of tissue for meniscal implantation, (2016).
