= Eleftheria Zeggini =

British geneticist

Ele Zeggini
- Born: Greek: Ελευθερία Ζεγγίνη; English: Eleftheria Zeggini; Volos, Greece
- Education: University of Manchester Institute of Science and Technology (BSc); University of Manchester (PhD)
- Awards: Suffrage Science award (2014)
- Scientific career
- Fields: Digital health Human genetics
- Workplaces: Helmholtz Zentrum München; Technical University of Munich; Wellcome Trust Sanger Institute; University of Oxford; University of Leicester; Wellcome Trust Centre for Human Genetics
- Thesis: Genetic dissection of the major histocompatibility complex in juvenile oligoarthritis (2002)
- Website: www.helmholtz-muenchen.de/itg/staff/staff-details/ma/8984/Professor-Zeggini/

Eleftheria Zeggini (Greek: Ελευθερία Ζεγγίνη) is a director of the institute of translational genomics in Helmholtz Zentrum München and a professor at the Technical University of Munich (TUM). Previously she served as a research group leader at the Wellcome Trust Sanger Institute from 2008 to 2018 and an honorary professor in the department of health sciences at the University of Leicester in the UK.

== Education ==
Zeggini was educated at the University of Manchester Institute of Science and Technology (UMIST) where she was awarded a Bachelor of Science degree in Biochemistry in 1999. She continued her studies on the immunogenetics of the major histocompatibility complex in childhood arthritis at the Arthritis Research UK epidemiology unit at the University of Manchester, and was awarded a PhD in 2002.

== Career and research ==
Following her PhD, Zeggini was a postdoctoral researcher at the Wellcome Trust Centre for Human Genetics at the University of Oxford where she later became a Wellcome Trust research career development fellow. She has been a group leader at the Sanger since 2008. As of 2020, according to Google scholar and Scopus her most cited work has been published in Science and Nature Genetics.

As of 2015 her work investigates the genetics of complex phenotypic traits in humans using genetic association studies to identify novel disease loci. In a study published in 2017, her team reported the discovery of a genetic variant in Mediterranean Cretan villagers that protected them against the harmful effects of 'bad' fats and cholesterol as well as decrease the risk of cardiovascular disease.

=== Awards and honours ===
Zeggini won the Suffrage Science award in 2014. She was elected a Fellow of the Academy of Medical Sciences in 2020.

== Personal life ==
Zeggini was born and raised in Volos, Greece.
