= Nicole Soranzo =

Italian British geneticist

Nicole Soranzo FMedSci
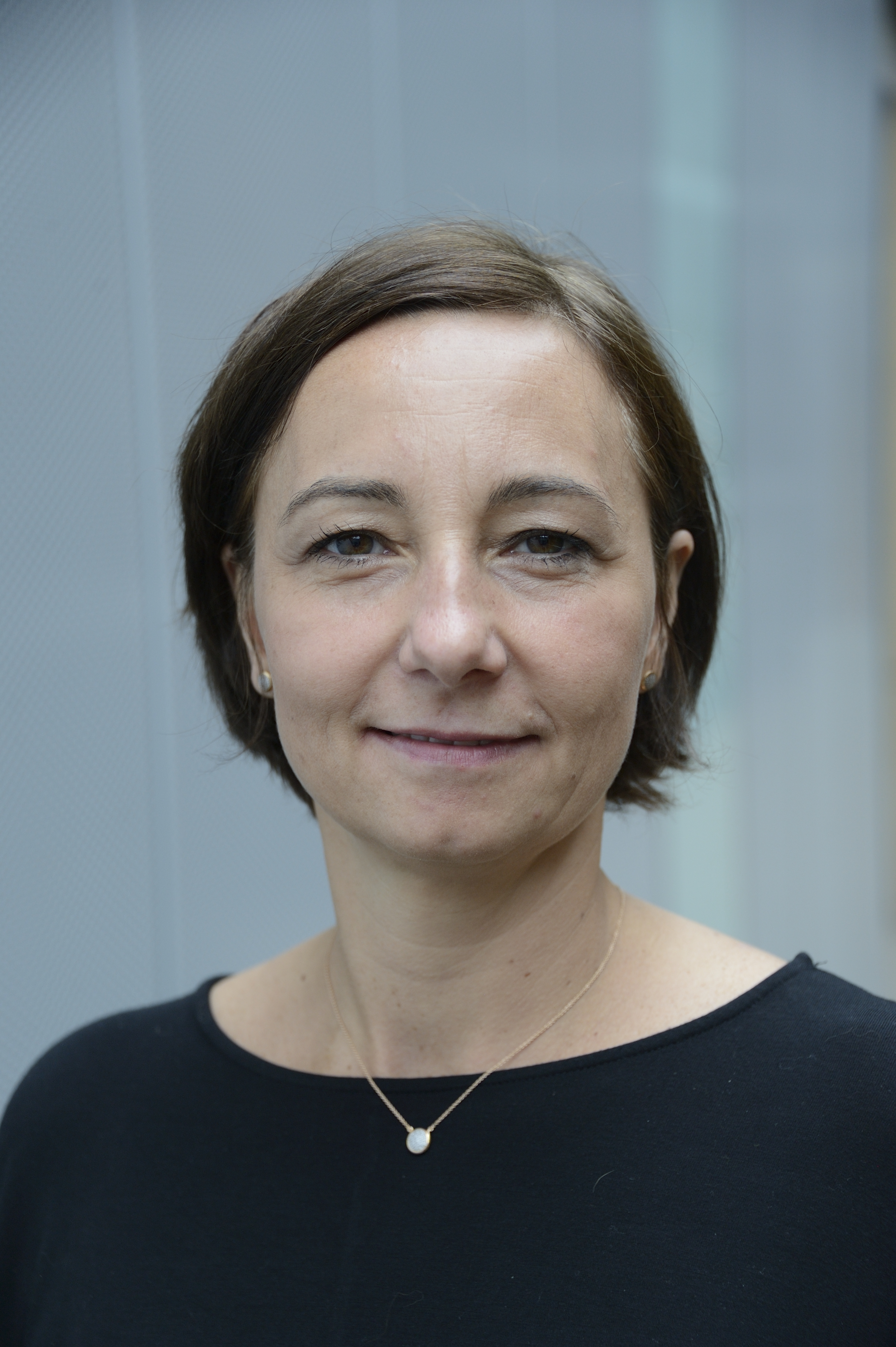
- Education: University of Milan (BSc); University of Dundee (PhD)
- Awards: Suffrage Science award (2012); EMBO Member (2019)
- Scientific career
- Fields: Genetics; Genomics; Complex traits
- Institutions: Human Technopole; Wellcome Sanger Institute; University of Cambridge; University College London; Johnson & Johnson
- Website: www.sanger.ac.uk/person/soranzo-nicole/

Nicole Soranzo FMedSci is an Italian-British senior group leader in human genetics at the Wellcome Sanger Institute, Professor of Human Genetics at the University of Cambridge. She is an internationally recognised Human Geneticist who has focused on the application of cutting edge genomic technologies to study the spectrum of human genetic variation associated with cardio-metabolic and immune diseases. She has led many large-scale discovery efforts including more than 1,000 novel genetic variants associated with cardio-metabolic diseases and their risk factors as well as establishing the HaemGen consortium, which is a worldwide effort to discover genetic determinants of blood cell formation and also interpretation of the downstream consequences of sequence variation through a host of integrative analyses and functional approaches.

== Education ==
Soranzo graduated with a Bachelor of Science degree from the University of Milan in Italy, and completed her PhD at the University of Dundee on genetic variation in native European populations of Scots pine.

== Career and research ==
After her postdoctoral training in quantitative population and statistical genetics at University College London (UK), Soranzo worked for the pharmaceutical company, Johnson and Johnson in the US, where she used human genetics to assist drug discovery and pharmacogenomics. In 2007, she returned to the UK to work at the Wellcome Sanger Institute and in 2009 started her own group there. She became a Principal of Research at the University of Cambridge School of Clinical Medicine in 2013, and a professor of Human Genetics in 2015.

Soranzo's group's research efforts aim at understanding how genetic factors interact with other non-genetic and epigenetic factors to influence phenotypic variation. They use large-scale genome sequencing data, epigenetic profiling and molecular traits such as gene expression and metabolomics. Soranzo and her team have generated rich genomic data resources for the scientific community, such as whole-genome sequence and phenotype data for population cohorts in the UK10K project, and a large genetic and epigenetic database for different blood cell types in the Blueprint project.

The National Institute for Health Research (NIHR) Blood and Transplant Research Units (BTRU) Genetics Theme, led by Soranzo, was motivated by a need of the National Health Service (NHS) Blood and Transplant Unit to move towards a more personalised service. Results are expected to contribute to understanding of how individual genetic profiles affect disease risk and treatment in the population at large, informing the implementation of personalised medicine strategies in the UK.

Soranzo chaired the UK10K Cohorts project, one of the first to use whole-genome sequencing to investigate the role of rare genetic variants and the Human Variation working group of the EU FP7 Blueprint project, an international effort to characterise the interplay of genetic and epigenetic factors on gene expression in three main immune cell types.

Soranzo is currently the leader of the Genetics Theme of the NIHR Blood & Transplant Research Unit (BTRU) in Population Health and Genomics, focusing on determinants of blood donation related biomarkers.

=== Awards and honours ===
- 2022 Elected a member of the Academia Europaea.
- 2019 Elected a member of the European Molecular Biology Organisation (EMBO)
- 2018 Elected a Fellow of the Academy of Medical Sciences (FMedSci)
- 2012 Suffrage Science award nominated by Dame Sally Davies
- 2010 Paula und Richard von Hertwig-Preis for International Cooperation, Germany
