= Véronique Miron =

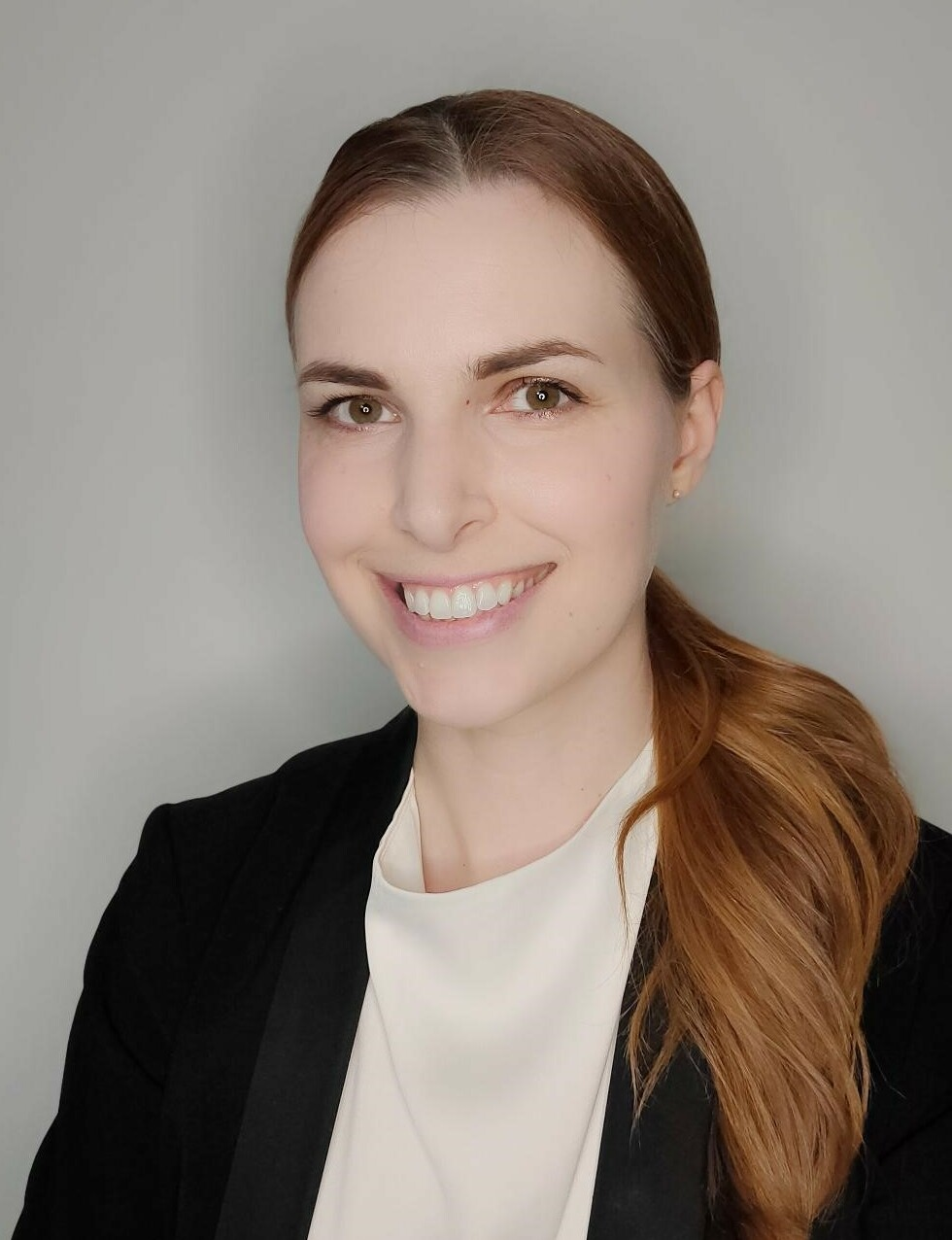
Véronique Miron

Véronique E. Miron is the John David Eaton Chair in Multiple Sclerosis Research at the Barlo MS Centre and Keenan Research Centre for Biomedical Science, Full Professor at the University of Toronto Department of Immunology, and Honorary Chair at the University of Edinburgh Dementia Research Institute. She was elected a Fellow of the Academy of Medical Sciences in 2026.

== Education ==
Miron received her B S. from McGill University in 2004, and her PhD in Neurological Sciences, also from McGill, with Prof Jack Antel in 2009. Her PhD thesis was on "The effects of CNS-accessible multiple sclerosis-directed immuno-modulatory therapies on oligodendroglial lineage cells, myelin maintenance, and remyelination". She then carried out her postdoctoral studies at the Centre for Regeneration in Scotland, training under Prof Charles ffrench-Constant and Prof Robin Franklin.

== Research ==
Miron conducts research on neuroimmunology, specifically, how microglia support myelin formation and regeneration. Much of her work is related to neurological disorders such as multiple sclerosis. She is one of the ten Laureates of the 2020 Suffrage Life Science award for her scientific investigations.

== Most cited publications ==
- Miron VE, Boyd A, Zhao JW, Yuen TJ, Ruckh JM, Shadrach JL, van Wijngaarden P, Wagers AJ, Williams A, Franklin RJ. M2 microglia and macrophages drive oligodendrocyte differentiation during CNS remyelination. Nature neuroscience. 2013 Sep;16(9):1211-8 to Google Scholar, it has been cited 1175 times.
- Kuhlmann T, Miron V, Cuo Q, Wegner C, Antel J, Brück W. Differentiation block of oligodendroglial progenitor cells as a cause for remyelination failure in chronic multiple sclerosis. Brain. 2008 Jul 1;131(7):1749-58. According to Google Scholar, this article has been cited 691 times
- Miron VE, Jung CG, Kim HJ, Kennedy TE, Soliven B, Antel JP. FTY720 modulates human oligodendrocyte progenitor process extension and survival. Annals of Neurology 2008 Jan;63(1):61-71. According to Google Scholar, this article has been cited 275 times
- Miron VE, Ludwin SK, Darlington PJ, Jarjour AA, Soliven B, Kennedy TE, Antel JP. Fingolimod (FTY720) enhances remyelination following demyelination of organotypic cerebellar slices. The American journal of pathology. 2010 Jun 1;176(6):2682-94 According to Google Scholar, this article has been cited 257 times
- Miron VE, Kuhlmann T, Antel JP. Cells of the oligodendroglial lineage, myelination, and remyelination. Biochimica et Biophysica Acta (BBA) - Molecular Basis of Disease. 2011 Feb 1;1812(2):184-93 According to Google Scholar, this article has been cited 250 times
- Miron VE, Schubart A, Antel JP. Central nervous system-directed effects of FTY720 (fingolimod). Journal of the neurological sciences. 2008 Nov 15;274(1-2):13-7 According to Google Scholar, this article has been cited 179 times.
- Miron VE, Franklin RJ. Macrophages and CNS remyelination. Journal of neurochemistry. 2014 Jul;130(2):165-71 According to Google Scholar, this article has been cited 165 times
