= Nan Laird =

- Born: Nan McKenzie Laird; September 18, 1943 (age 82); Gainesville, Florida, USA
- Education: Rice University; University of Georgia; Harvard University
- Known for: Expectation-maximization algorithm, DerSimonian-Laird estimator
- Awards: (2021) International Prize in Statistics (2016) 25th Annual Distinguished Statistician Lecture from UCONN, the American Statistical Association and Pfizer (2011) 25th Annual Lowell Reed Lecturer from the American Public Health Association (2011) Samuel S. Wilks Award, from the American Statistical Association
- Scientific career
- Institutions: Harvard T.H. Chan School of Public Health
- Thesis: Log-linear models with random parameters: an empirical Bayes approach (1975)
- Doctoral advisor: Arthur P. Dempster
- Doctoral students: Christl Donnelly, Rebecca DerSimonian, Fong Wang Clow, Joseph W. Hogan, Garrett M. Fitzmaurice, Nicholas J. Horton, Stephen Lake and Steve Horvath
- Website: www.hsph.harvard.edu/nan-laird/

Nan McKenzie Laird (born September 18, 1943) is the Harvey V. Fineberg Professor of Public Health, Emerita in Biostatistics at the Harvard T.H. Chan School of Public Health. She served as Chair of the Department from 1990 to 1999. She was the Henry Pickering Walcott Professor of Biostatistics from 1991 to 1999.

== Education ==
Laird began her undergraduate studies at Rice University in 1961, first majoring in mathematics, before switching to French. She left Rice in her junior year in college and moved to New York City. Later, she resumed studies at University of Georgia in computer science before eventually switching to statistics and earned her BA in 1969. Laird worked between 1969 and 1971 as a computer programmer on the Apollo program at MIT's Draper Laboratory before starting her graduate studies at Harvard University in statistics in 1971. She received her PhD from Harvard in 1975 under Arthur Dempster and was hired as a faculty member directly after graduation. She remained at Harvard until her retirement, when she became an emeritus professor.

== Career and research ==
Laird is well known for many seminal papers in biostatistics applications and methods, including the expectation–maximization algorithm.

=== Selected publications ===
- DerSimonian, R.; Laird, N. (1986), "Meta-analysis in clinical trials", Controlled Clinical Trials, 7 (3): 177–188, doi:10.1016/0197-2456(86)90046-2, PMID 3802833
- Laird NM and Ware, JH. (1982) "Random effects models for longitudinal data: an overview of recent results". Biometrics; 38:963-974.
- Dempster, A. P.; Laird, N.; Rubin, D. B. (1977), "Maximum likelihood from incomplete data via the EM algorithm", Journal of the Royal Statistical Society, Series B, 39 (1): 1–38, doi:10.1111/j.2517-6161.1977.tb01600.x, JSTOR 2984875

=== Honors and awards ===
Her honors include the third International Prize in Statistics in 2021, the 25th Annual Distinguished Statistician Lecture from the University of Connecticut, the American Statistical Association and Pfizer in 2016, the 25th Annual Lowell Reed Lecturer, from the American Public Health Association in 2011, the Samuel S. Wilks Award, from the American Statistical Association in 2011, the Myra Samuels Lecturer award from Purdue University in 2004, the Janet L. Norwood Award in 2003 from the American Statistical Association, the Florence Nightingale David Award in 2001 from the Committee of Presidents of Statistical Societies, and several other fellowships.

Laird is a Fellow of the American Statistical Association, as well as the Institute of Mathematical Statistics. She is an Elected Member of the International Statistical Institute.
