= Selina Wray =

British neuroscientist

- Education: University of Nottingham; King's College London; Barnsley College
- Scientific career
- Workplaces: University College London

Selina Wray is a British neuroscientist who is a professor of Molecular Neuroscience and an Alzheimer’s Research UK Senior Research Fellow in the Department of Neurodegenerative Disease at the UCL Queen Square Institute of Neurology. She also serves as Deputy Director for Partnerships and Communications. Her work focuses on using patient‑derived stem cells to model dementia and accelerate the development of new treatments. In 2014, she was named Red Magazine’s Woman of the Year.

== Early life and education ==
Wray was born in Barnsley. She lived in social housing, and attended Longcar and Holgate School before attending Barnsley College. She completed her undergraduate degree in biochemistry and biological chemistry at the University of Nottingham. During her undergraduate studies, she gained her first experience working in a research laboratory, which led her to pursue a career in experimental science. She undertook doctoral training in the laboratory of Diane Hanger at the Institute of Psychiatry, Psychology and Neuroscience at King's College London. During her doctoral research she became increasingly aware of the medical and societal importance of dementia research and the relative lack of funding in the field. This experience shaped her decision to remain in dementia research and to focus on improving experimental models of neurodegenerative disease.

Wray joined the UCL Queen Square Institute of Neurology as an Alzheimer's Research UK Junior Research Fellow. She completed visiting research placements with Tilo Kunath at the University of Edinburgh and Rick Livesey at the University of Cambridge.

== Research and career ==
Wray established her own research laboratory at the UCL Queen Square Institute of Neurology. Wray’s research uses cells derived from dementia patients to create laboratory models that replicate key features of the disease. These stem‑cell‑based models are used to investigate the mechanisms that cause brain cells to degenerate in dementia and to identify ways of slowing or preventing this damage.

A central aim of her work is to improve the pre‑clinical testing of potential treatments. By developing more accurate and reliable laboratory models, her research seeks to increase the likelihood that drugs progressing to clinical trials will be effective. Wray uses induced pluripotent stem cell (iPSC) technology to model neurodegenerative disease. She works alongside clinicians to obtain biological samples from individuals with rare genetic forms of dementia. Using these models, her research aims to investigate the molecular mechanisms underlying Alzheimer’s disease and frontotemporal dementia. She was made a professor in 2020.

== Awards and honours ==
- 2014 Red Magazine Woman of the Year Award
- 2018 Alzheimer's Research UK David Hague Early Career Investigator of the Year Award
- 2024 Suffrage Science award in Life Sciences
- 2026 Alzheimer's Association Excellence in Mentoring Award

== Selected publications ==
- Jessica W Wu; S Abid Hussaini; Isle M Bastille; et al. (2016). "Neuronal activity enhances tau propagation and tau pathology in vivo". Nature Neuroscience. 19 (8): 1085–1092. doi:10.1038/nn.4328. PMC 4961585. PMID 27322420. Wikidata Q37127500.
- Goran Šimić; Mirjana Babić Leko; Selina Wray; et al. (2016). "Tau Protein Hyperphosphorylation and Aggregation in Alzheimer's Disease and Other Tauopathies, and Possible Neuroprotective Strategies". Biomolecules. 6 (1): 6. doi:10.3390/biom6010006. PMC 4808800. PMID 26751493. Wikidata Q26769957.
- Diane P. Hanger; Helen L Byers; Selina Wray; et al. (2007). "Novel phosphorylation sites in tau from Alzheimer brain support a role for casein kinase 1 in disease pathogenesis". Journal of Biological Chemistry. 282 (32): 23645–23654. doi:10.1074/jbc.m703269200. PMID 17562708. Wikidata Q48139089.

== Personal life ==
Wray is a runner, and has run the London Marathon to raise money for Alzheimer's Research UK.

She is also partial to nautical stripes and can frequently be spotted around Bloomsbury donning her Breton.
