= John Fisher (biomedical engineer) =

British biomedical engineer

John Fisher, CBE, FREng, FMedSci is a British biomedical engineer who was director of the Institute of Medical and Biological Engineering until he stepped down from the role in summer 2016. He remains a professor of mechanical engineering and deputy vice-chancellor at the University of Leeds.

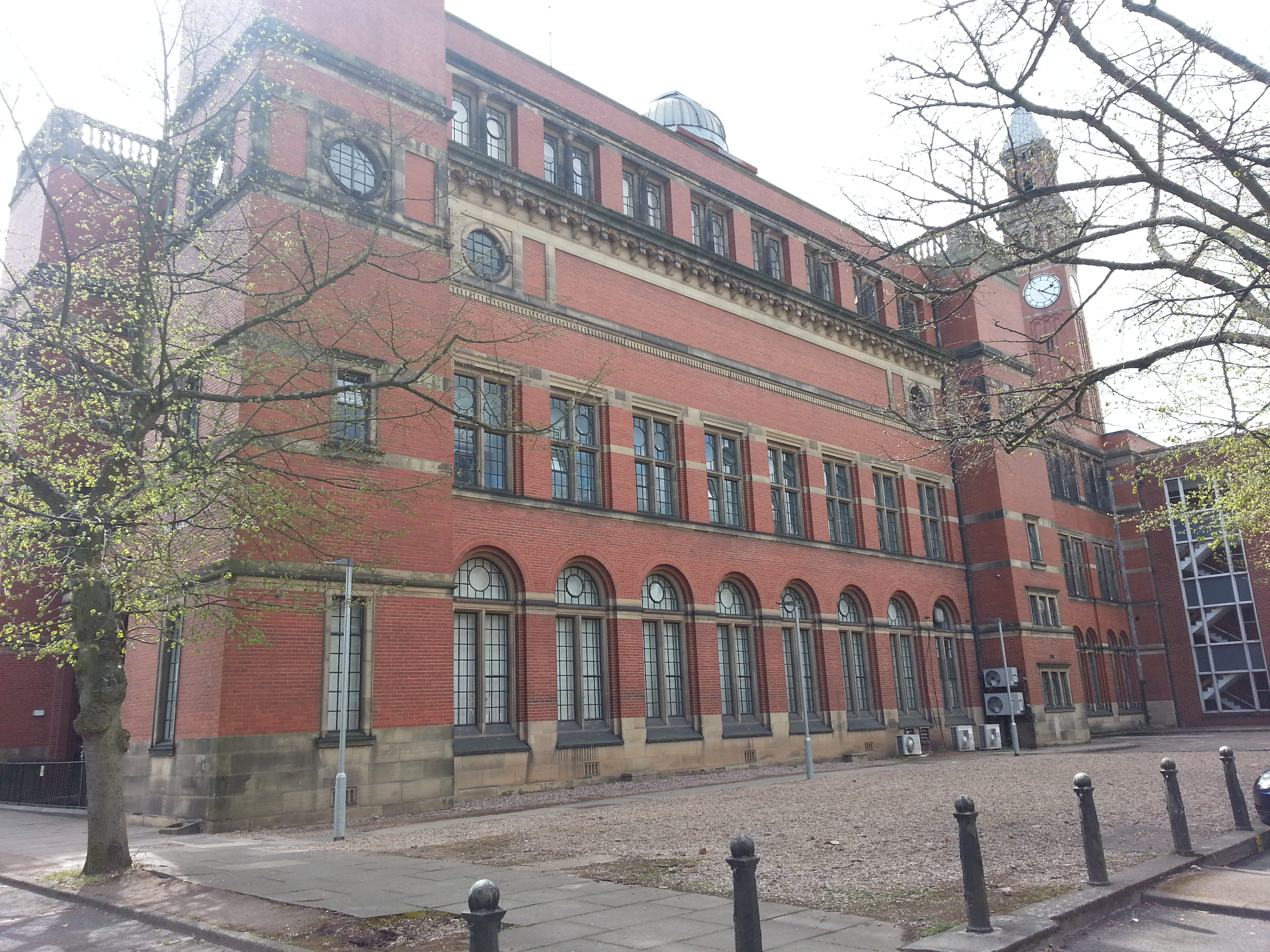
Birmingham University

Fisher graduated from the University of Birmingham with a BSc in physics in 1976. He invented the revolutionary ceramic-on-metal hip replacement. He is leading the research initiative "50 active years after 50", which is investigating tissue-regeneration technology and developing new medical devices and therapies.

Fisher was appointed a Commander of the Order of the British Empire in the 2011 New Year Honours for services to biomedical engineering. He was awarded the honorary degree of DEng by the University of Birmingham in 2013. Fisher is a Fellow of the Institution of Mechanical Engineers, of the Institute of Physics and Engineering in Medicine, of the Academy of Medical Sciences, and of the Royal Academy of Engineering.

Fisher has published over four hundred peer-reviewed papers and won over £100 million of grant funding.
