= Jane Endicott =

Professor of Cancer Structural Biology

- Education: Corpus Christi College, University of Oxford
- Awards: MRC Suffrage Science Award
- Scientific career
- Fields: Structural biology, cancer
- Workplaces: Newcastle University, Ontorio Cancer Institute, University of Oxford
- Academic advisors: Professor Paul Nurse, Professor Louise Johnson, Victor Ling

Jane Endicott is a structural biologist. She has been a Professor of Cancer Structural Biology at Newcastle University's Faculty of Medical Sciences and a member of the Cancer Research UK Newcastle Drug Discovery Unit since October 2011. She is also a member of the Newcastle University Cancer Leads Group and the Newcastle University Centre for Cancer Fellowships Steering Group, as well as a Emeritus Fellow at St Cross College, University of Oxford.

== Education and career ==
After studying Biochemistry at Corpus Christi College, the University of Oxford, Endicott completed her PhD at the Ontario Cancer Institute, as part of the laboratory team of Victor Ling. In 1991, she joined the laboratories of Paul Nurse and Louise Johnson at the University of Oxford, as a Junior Research Fellow of the National Cancer Institute of Canada, to conduct research into cyclin-dependent protein kinases (CDKs).

She was awarded a Royal Society University Research Fellowship in 1995, and has a Lectureship at Trinity College, University of Oxford.

== Research ==
Endicott's specialises in cell cycle structural biology and transcription. Her group studies how proteins involved in transcription and other cell cycle processes interact with each other, and whether blocking some of these connections could treat cancer. The lab also works with the Cancer Research UK Newcastle Drug Discovery Unit projects.

== Awards ==
Endicott was awarded a Medical Research Council (MRC) Suffrage Science Award in 2014 for her scientific achievements.

== Publications ==
PubMed lists over 65 publication listings for Endicott, the most cited are:

- Endicott JA, Ling V. The biochemistry of P-glycoprotein-mediated multidrug resistance. Annual Review of Biochemistry. 1989 Jul;58(1):137-71. According to Google Scholar, this article has been cited 2555 times >
- Noble ME, Endicott JA, Johnson LN. Protein kinase inhibitors: insights into drug design from structure. Science. 2004 Mar 19;303(5665):1800-5. According to Google Scholar, it has been cited 1458 times.
- Hoessel R, Leclerc S, Endicott JA, Nobel ME, Lawrie A, Tunnah P, Leost M, Damiens E, Marie D, Marko D, Niederberger E. Indirubin, the active constituent of a Chinese antileukaemia medicine, inhibits cyclin-dependent kinases. Nature cell biology. 1999 May;1(1):60-7. According to Google Scholar, this article has been cited 910 times
- Gerlach JH, Endicott JA, Juranka PF, Henderson G, Sarangi F, Deuchars KL, Ling V. Homology between P-glycoprotein and a bacterial haemolysin transport protein suggests a model for multidrug resistance. Nature. 1986 Dec;324(6096):485-9. According to Google Scholar, this article has been cited 741 times

Some of the most recent are:

- Structural insights into the functional diversity of the CDK-cyclin family. Wood DJ, Endicott JA. Open Biology 2018 Sep;8(9):180112. doi: 10.1098/rsob.180112. PMID 30185601 Free PMC article. Review.
- CDK1 structures reveal conserved and unique features of the essential cell cycle CDK. Brown NR, Korolchuk S, Martin MP, Stanley WA, Moukhametzianov R, Noble MEM, Endicott JA. Nature Communications. 2015 Apr 13;6:6769. doi: 10.1038/ncomms7769. PMID 25864384 Free PMC article.
- Identification of a novel orally bioavailable ERK5 inhibitor with selectivity over p38α and BRD4. Myers SM, Miller DC, Molyneux L, Arasta M, Bawn RH, Blackburn TJ, Cook SJ, Edwards N, Endicott JA, Golding BT, Griffin RJ, Hammonds T, Hardcastle IR, Harnor SJ, Heptinstall AB, Lochhead PA, Martin MP, Martin NC, Newell DR, Owen PJ, Pang LC, Reuillon T, Rigoreau LJM, Thomas HD, Tucker JA, Wang LZ, Wong AC, Noble MEM, Wedge SR, Cano C. European Journal of Medicinal Chemistry. 2019 Sep 15;178:530-543. doi: 10.1016/j.ejmech.2019.05.057. Epub 2019 May 25. PMID 31212132
- Structure-based discovery of cyclin-dependent protein kinase inhibitors. Martin MP, Endicott JA, Noble MEM. Essays in Biochemistry. 2017 Nov 8;61(5):439-452. doi: 10.1042/EBC20170040. Print 2017 Nov 8. PMID 29118092 Free PMC article. Review. \
