= Marysia Placzek =

Professor of Developmental Neurobiology

- Education: Imperial College London (Doctor of Philosophy)
- Awards: Suffrage Science Award
- Scientific career
- Fields: Neurobiology
- Workplaces: The University of Sheffield
- Website: https://www.sheffield.ac.uk/biosciences/people/bms-staff/academic/marysia-placzek

Marysia Placzek is a Wellcome Trust Investigator and Professor of Developmental Neurobiology in the Department of Biomedical Science, The University of Sheffield.

In 2012, Placzek was one of ten women to receive a Suffrage Science award (Life Sciences category) from the Medical Research Council (MRC) London Institute of Medical Sciences.

In 2023, Placzek was awarded The Waddington Medal from the British Society for Developmental Biology, awarded for major contributions to developmental biology in the United Kingdom.

Placzek has served as the Chair of the Wellcome Trust Expert Review Group: Cell and Developmental Biology, and as a Scientific Advisory Board member for GW4 Biomed MRC Doctoral Training Partnership. She has also served on the Molecules, Genes and Cells Funding Committee for the Wellcome Trust.

Placzek's work focuses on vertebrate hypothalamus
