= James H. Ware =

American biostatistician (1941–2016)

James Hutchinson Ware (October 27, 1941 – April 26, 2016) was an American biostatistician and the Frederick Mosteller Professor of Biostatistics and Associate Dean for Clinical and Translational Science at the Harvard T.H. Chan School of Public Health. He had been Academic Dean for 19 years (1990-2009) under Deans Harvey Fineberg and Barry Bloom and served as Acting Dean from 1997 to 1998, as Harvey Fineberg assumed the position of Provost of Harvard University. During Ware's 19-year tenure as academic dean (1990-2009), the student the School's student body doubled in size and its research budget grew at an annual rate of eight percent. Ware was a co-investigator in the landmark Six Cities Study of Air Pollution and Health, which has had a profound effect on Clean Air Act regulations in the U.S. and efforts to limit air pollution around the world.

== Education ==
- Yale University, New Haven, Connecticut B.A. 1963 Mathematics
- Stanford University, Stanford, California M.S. 1965 Statistics
- Stanford University, Stanford, California Ph.D. 1969 Statistics

"Dissertation: Regression when Both Variables are Subject to Error and the Ranks of Their Means are Known." Advisor: Bradley Efron

== Career ==
James Ware joined the Harvard School of Public Health faculty in 1979 after receiving his PhD in statistics from Stanford University and spending eight years as mathematical statistician at the National Heart, Lung, and Blood Institute. As Dean, he was involved with a number of controversial issues.

The annual James H. Ware Award is given to a graduating student or student team "from any department and program who have engaged in a practice opportunity or experience during their time at Harvard T.H. Chan School of Public Health." There is also a James H. Ware Scholarship Fund.

He died of esophageal cancer on April 26, 2016. Flags were flown at half mast at the Harvard Medical School and Harvard T.H. Chan School of Public Health.

== Honors ==
- Fellow, American Statistical Association (1987)
- Member, International Statistical Institute
- Past President, E.N.A.R. (Eastern North America Region), International Biometric Society

== Publications ==
- Madder, RD; Husaini, M; Davis, AT; VanOosterhout, S; Khan, M; Wohns, D; McNamara, RF; Wolschleger, K; Gribar, J; Collins, JS; Jacoby, M; Decker, JM; Hendricks, M; Sum, ST; Madden, S; Ware, JH; Muller, JE (2016). "Large lipid-rich coronary plaques detected by near-infrared spectroscopy at non-stented sites in the target artery identify patients likely to experience future major adverse cardiovascular events". Eur Heart J Cardiovasc Imaging. 17: 393–9. doi:10.1093/ehjci/jev340. PMID 26800770..
- Speizer, FE; Ware, JH (2015). "Exploring Different Phenotypes of COPD". N. Engl. J. Med. 373: 185–6. doi:10.1056/NEJMe1503888. PMID 26154792..
- Dockery, DW; Ware, JH (2015). "Cleaner air, bigger lungs". N. Engl. J. Med. 372: 970–2. doi:10.1056/NEJMe1415785. PMID 25738674..
- Gleason, K; Shin, D; Rueschman, M; Weinstock, T; Wang, R; Ware, JH; Mittleman, MA; Redline, S (2014). "Challenges in recruitment to a randomized controlled study of cardiovascular disease reduction in sleep apnea: an analysis of alternative strategies". Sleep. 37: 2035–8. doi:10.5665/sleep.4266. PMC 4548521. PMID 25325506..
- Ware, JH; Vetrovec, GW; Miller, AB; Van Tosh, A; Gaffney, M; Yunis, C; Arteaga, C; Borer, JS (2013). "Cardiovascular safety of varenicline: patient-level meta-analysis of randomized, blinded, placebo-controlled trials". Am J Ther. 20: 235–46. doi:10.1097/MJT.0b013e31828d455b. PMID 23615317..
- Wang, R; Ware, JH (2013). "Detecting moderator effects using subgroup analyses". Prev Sci. 14: 111–20. doi:10.1007/s11121-011-0221-x. PMC 3193873. PMID 21562742..
- Martin, CR; Dasilva, DA; Cluette-Brown, JE; Dimonda, C; Hamill, A; Bhutta, AQ; Coronel, E; Wilschanski, M; Stephens, AJ; Driscoll, DF; Bistrian, BR; Ware, JH; Zaman, MM; Freedman, SD (2011). "Decreased postnatal docosahexaenoic and arachidonic acid blood levels in premature infants are associated with neonatal morbidities". J. Pediatr. 159: 743–749.e1–2. doi:10.1016/j.jpeds.2011.04.039. PMC 3701520. PMID 21658712..
- Ware, JH; Hamel, MB (2011). "Pragmatic trials--guides to better patient care?". N. Engl. J. Med. 364: 1685–7. doi:10.1056/NEJMp1103502. PMID 21542739..
- Verma, SK; Lombardi, DA; Chang, WR; Courtney, TK; Huang, YH; Brennan, MJ; Mittleman, MA; Ware, JH; Perry, MJ (2011). "Rushing, distraction, walking on contaminated floors and risk of slipping in limited-service restaurants: a case--crossover study". Occup Environ Med. 68: 575–81. doi:10.1136/oem.2010.056226. PMID 21097951..
- Verma, SK; Chang, WR; Courtney, TK; Lombardi, DA; Huang, YH; Brennan, MJ; Mittleman, MA; Ware, JH; Perry, MJ (2011). "A prospective study of floor surface, shoes, floor cleaning and slipping in US limited-service restaurant workers". Occup Environ Med. 68: 279–85. doi:10.1136/oem.2010.056218. PMID 20935283..
- Fitzmaurice GM, Laird NM, Ware JH, Applied Longitudinal Analysis, 2nd Edition, August 2011, ISBN 978-0-470-38027-7.7.
- Kirtane, AJ; Parise, H; Mehran, R; Moses, JW; Fahy, M; Bertrand, ME; Ohman, EM; White, HD; Feit, F; Colombo, A; McLaurin, BT; Cox, DA; Ware, JH; Pocock, SJ; Lansky, AJ; Stone, GW (2010). "Comparison of catheterization laboratory initiated abciximab and eptifibatide during percutaneous coronary intervention in acute coronary syndromes (an ACUITY substudy)". Am. J. Cardiol. 106: 180–6. doi:10.1016/j.amjcard.2010.03.015. PMID 20599000..
- Kazani, S; Ware, JH; Drazen, JM; Taylor, DR; Sears, MR (2010). "The safety of long-acting beta-agonists: more evidence is needed". Respirology. 15: 881–5, discussion 885–6. doi:10.1111/j.1440-1843.2010.01800.x. PMID 20624253..
- Ebrahimi, R; Dyke, C; Mehran, R; Manoukian, SV; Feit, F; Cox, DA; Gersh, BJ; Ohman, EM; White, HD; Moses, JW; Ware, JH; Lincoff, AM; Stone, GW (2009). "Outcomes following pre-operative clopidogrel administration in patients with acute coronary syndromes undergoing coronary artery bypass surgery: the ACUITY (Acute Catheterization and Urgent Intervention Triage strategY) trial". J. Am. Coll. Cardiol. 53: 1965–72. doi:10.1016/j.jacc.2009.03.006. PMID 19460609..
- LeWinn KZ, Stroud LR, Molnar BE, Ware JH, Koenen KC, Buka SL. Elevated maternal cortisol levels during pregnancy are associated with reduced childhood IQ. Int J Epidemiol. 2009 Dec; 38(6):1700-10.
- Pocock, SJ; Ware, JH (2009). "Translating statistical findings into plain English". Lancet. 373: 1926–8. doi:10.1016/S0140-6736(09)60499-2. PMID 19375158..
- Mehran, R; Pocock, SJ; Stone, GW; Clayton, TC; Dangas, GD; Feit, F; Manoukian, SV; Nikolsky, E; Lansky, AJ; Kirtane, A; White, HD; Colombo, A; Ware, JH; Moses, JW; Ohman, EM (2009). "Associations of major bleeding and myocardial infarction with the incidence and timing of mortality in patients presenting with non-ST-elevation acute coronary syndromes: a risk model from the ACUITY trial". Eur. Heart J. 30: 1457–66. doi:10.1093/eurheartj/ehp110. PMC 2695951. PMID 19351691..
- Ropper, AH; Gorson, KC; Gooch, CL; Weinberg, DH; Pieczek, A; Ware, JH; Kershen, J; Rogers, A; Simovic, D; Schratzberger, P; Kirchmair, R; Losordo, D (Apr 2009). "Vascular endothelial growth factor gene transfer for diabetic polyneuropathy: a randomized, double-blinded trial". Ann Neurol. 65 (4): 386–93. doi:10.1002/ana.21675. PMC 4709012. PMID 19399887.
- Mehta, C; Gao, P; Bhatt, DL; Harrington, RA; Skerjanec, S; Ware, JH (2009). "Optimizing trial design: sequential, adaptive, and enrichment strategies". Circulation. 119: 597–605. doi:10.1161/CIRCULATIONAHA.108.809707. PMID 19188520..
- Lincoff, AM; Steinhubl, SR; Manoukian, SV; Chew, D; Pollack, CV; Feit, F; Ware, JH; Bertrand, ME; Ohman, EM; Desmet, W; Cox, DA; Mehran, R; Stone, GW (2008). "Influence of timing of clopidogrel treatment on the efficacy and safety of bivalirudin in patients with non-ST-segment elevation acute coronary syndromes undergoing percutaneous coronary intervention: an analysis of the ACUITY (Acute Catheterization and Urgent Intervention Triage strategY) trial". JACC Cardiovasc Interv. 1: 639–48. doi:10.1016/j.jcin.2008.10.004. PMID 19463378..
- Barrero, LH; Katz, JN; Perry, MJ; Krishnan, R; Ware, JH; Dennerlein, JT (2009). "Work pattern causes bias in self-reported activity duration: a randomised study of mechanisms and implications for exposure assessment and epidemiology". Occup Environ Med. 66: 38–44. doi:10.1136/oem.2007.037291. PMC 3257319. PMID 18805887..
- Drazen, JM; D'Agostino, RB; Ware, JH; Morrissey, S; Curfman, GD (2008). "Ezetimibe and cancer--an uncertain association". N Engl J Med. 359: 1398–9. doi:10.1056/NEJMe0807200. PMID 18765434..
- Krieger, N; Chen, JT; Ware, JH; Kaddour, A (2008). "Race/ethnicity and breast cancer estrogen receptor status: impact of class, missing data, and modeling assumptions". Cancer Causes Control. 19: 1305–18. doi:10.1007/s10552-008-9202-1. PMC 2635927. PMID 18704721..
- White, HD; Chew, DP; Hoekstra, JW; Miller, CD; Pollack, CV; Feit, F; Lincoff, AM; Bertrand, M; Pocock, S; Ware, J; Ohman, EM; Mehran, R; Stone, GW (2008). "Safety and efficacy of switching from either unfractionated heparin or enoxaparin to bivalirudin in patients with non-ST-segment elevation acute coronary syndromes managed with an invasive strategy: results from the ACUITY (Acute Catheterization and Urgent Intervention Triage strategY) trial". J. Am. Coll. Cardiol. 51: 1734–41. doi:10.1016/j.jacc.2007.12.052. PMID 18452778..
- Gao, P; Ware, JH (2008). "Assessing non-inferiority: a combination approach". Stat Med. 27: 392–406. doi:10.1002/sim.2938. PMID 17575568..
- Ware, JH; Cai, T (2008). "Comments on 'Evaluating the added predictive ability of a new marker: From area under the ROC curve to reclassification and beyond' by M. J. Pencina et al., Statistics in Medicine (DOI: 10.1002/sim.2929)". Stat Med. 27: 185–7. doi:10.1002/sim.2985. PMID 17668917..
- Gao, P; Ware, JH; Mehta, C (2008). "Sample size re-estimation for adaptive sequential design in clinical trials". J Biopharm Stat. 18: 1184–96. doi:10.1080/10543400802369053. PMID 18991116..
- Chen, A; Dietrich, KN; Ware, JH; Radcliffe, J; Rogan, WJ (2005). "IQ and blood lead from 2 to 7 years of age: are the effects in older children the residual of high blood lead concentrations in 2-year-olds?". Environ. Health Perspect. 113: 597–601. PMC 1257553. PMID 15866769..
- Glass, TA; Berkman, LF; Hiltunen, EF; Furie, K; Glymour, MM; Fay, ME; Ware, J (2004). "The Families In Recovery From Stroke Trial (FIRST): primary study results". Psychosom Med. 66: 889–97. doi:10.1097/01.psy.0000146326.01642.ca. PMID 15564354..
- Weuve, J; Kang, JH; Manson, JE; Breteler, MM; Ware, JH; Grodstein, F (2004). "Physical activity, including walking, and cognitive function in older women". JAMA. 292: 1454–61. doi:10.1001/jama.292.12.1454. PMID 15383516..
- Bartels, SJ; Coakley, EH; Zubritsky, C; Ware, JH; Miles, KM; Areán, PA; Chen, H; Oslin, DW; Llorente, MD; Costantino, G; Quijano, L; McIntyre, JS; Linkins, KW; Oxman, TE; Maxwell, J; Levkoff, SE (2004). "Improving access to geriatric mental health services: a randomized trial comparing treatment engagement with integrated versus enhanced referral care for depression, anxiety, and at-risk alcohol use". Am J Psychiatry. 161: 1455–62. doi:10.1176/appi.ajp.161.8.1455. PMID 15285973..
- Dietrich, KN; Ware, JH; Salganik, M; Radcliffe, J; Rogan, WJ; Rhoads, GG; Fay, ME; Davoli, CT; Denckla, MB; Bornschein, RL; Schwarz, D; Dockery, DW; Adubato, S; Jones, RL (2004). "Effect of chelation therapy on the neuropsychological and behavioral development of lead-exposed children after school entry". Pediatrics. 114: 19–26. PMID 15231903..

== See also ==
- Air pollution
- Clean Air Act (United States)
- Particulate pollution

== Additional ==
- Harvard Catalyst profile for James Hutchinson Ware, PhD
- History of the Harvard School of Public Health
- Ryan, L. A Conversation with Nan Laird
- Knox RA, A Harvard Study on Newborns Draws Fire, Boston Globe, August 7, 1989, p. 25.
- NIH biosketch for James H. Ware
