= Ellenberg =

Ellenberg may refer to:

== Places ==
=== Germany ===
- Ellenberg, Baden-Württemberg
- Ellenberg, Rhineland-Palatinate
- Ellenberg, Saxony-Anhalt, in Altmarkkreis Salzwedel district

=== Elsewhere ===
- Ellenburg, New York, a town

== People ==
- Heinz Ellenberg (1913–1997), botanist and ecologist
- Jordan Ellenberg (born 1971), mathematician
- Jonas H. Ellenberg, American biostatistician
- Susan S. Ellenberg, American biostatistician
