= How Not to Be Wrong =

Book by Jordan Ellenberg

How Not to Be Wrong: The Power of Mathematical Thinking
- Hardback edition
- Author: Jordan Ellenberg
- Language: English
- Genre: Mathematics
- Publisher: Penguin Group
- Publication date: May 29, 2014
- Publication place: United States
- Media type: Print
- Pages: 468 pp.
- ISBN: 978-1594205224

How Not to Be Wrong: The Power of Mathematical Thinking, written by Jordan Ellenberg, is a New York Times Bestselling book that connects various economic and societal philosophies with basic mathematics and statistical principles.

== Summary ==
How Not to Be Wrong explains the mathematics behind some of simplest day-to-day thinking. It then goes into more complex decisions people make. For example, Ellenberg explains many misconceptions about lotteries and whether or not they can be mathematically beaten.

Ellenberg uses mathematics to examine real-world issues ranging from the loving of straight lines in the reporting of obesity to the game theory of missing flights, from the relevance to digestion of regression to the mean to the counter-intuitive Berkson's paradox.

== Chapter summaries ==
=== Part 1: Linearity ===
Chapter 1, Less Like Sweden: Ellenberg encourages his readers to think nonlinearly, and know that "where you should go depends on where you are". To develop his thought, he relates this to Voodoo economics and the Laffer curve of taxation. Although there are few numbers in this chapter, the point is that the overall concept still ties back to mathematical thinking.

Chapter 2, Straight Locally, Curved Globally: This chapter puts an emphasis on recognizing that "not every curve is a straight line", and makes reference to multiple mathematical concepts including the Pythagorean theorem, the derivation of Pi, Zeno's paradox, and non-standard analysis.

Chapter 3, Everyone is Obese: Here, Ellenberg dissects some common statistics about Obesity trends in the United States. He ties it into linear regression, and points out basic contradictions made by the original arguments presented. He uses many examples, including the correlation between SAT scores and tuition rates, as well as the trajectory of missiles, to advise caution when using linear regression.

Chapter 4, How Many Is That In Dead Americans: Ellenberg analyzes statistics about the number of casualties around the world in different countries resulting from war. He notes that although proportion in these cases matters, it doesn't always necessarily make sense when relating them to American deaths. He uses examples of deaths due to brain cancer, the Binomial Theorem, and voting polls to reinforce his point.

Chapter 5, More Pie Than Plate: This chapter goes in depth with number percentages relating to employment rates, and references political allegations. He emphasizes that "actual numbers in these cases aren't important, but knowing what to divide by what is mathematics in its truest form", noting that mathematics in itself is in everything. He warns about how percentages can be misleading if it's not clear that they can go below 0% or above 100%.

=== Part 2: Inference ===
Chapter 6, The Baltimore Stockbroker and the Bible Code: Ellenberg tries to get across that mathematics is in every single thing that we do. To support this, he uses examples about hidden codes in the Torah determined by Equidistant Letter Sequence, a stockbroker parable, noting that "improbable things happen", and wiggle room attributes to that.

Chapter 7, Dead Fish Don't Read Minds: This chapter touches on a lot of things. The basis for this chapter are stories about a dead salmon's MRI, trial and error in algebra, birth control statistics, alliteration in Shakespeare, and basketball statistics (the "hot hand"). Additionally, he writes of a few other mathematical concepts, including the Null hypothesis and the Quartic function. He explains how underpowered statistical studies can lead to misleading results, especially when the result given by the null hypothesis is close to the result gotten by rejecting it.

Chapter 8, Reductio Ad Unlikely: This chapter focuses on the works and theorems/concepts of many famous mathematicians and philosophers. These include but aren't limited to the reductio ad absurdum method, a look into the constellation Taurus by John Mitchell, and Yitang "Tom" Zhang's "bounded gaps" proof. He also delves into explaining rational numbers, the prime number theorem, and makes up his own word, "flogarithms".

Chapter 9, The International Journal of Haruspicy: Ellenberg relates the practice of haruspicy, genes that affect schizophrenia, and the accuracy of published papers as well as other things to the "p-value" or statistical significance. He talks about p-hacking, which can arise when using a hard rule like "p<0.05," and how confidence intervals can help solve this problem. He also notes at the end that Jerzy Neyman and Egon Pearson claimed that statistics is about doing, not interpreting, and that R. A. Fisher believed scientists should not have a "fixed level of significance at which from year to year, and in all circumstances, he rejects hypotheses; he rather gives his mind to each particular case in the light of his evidence and his ideas".

Chapter 10, Are You There, God? It's Me, Bayesian Inference: This chapter relates algorithms to things ranging from God, to Netflix movie recommendations, and to terrorism on Facebook. Ellenberg goes through quite a few mathematical concepts in this chapter, which include conditional probabilities relating back to "p-value", posterior possibilities, Bayesian inference, and Bayes theorem as they correlate to radio psychics and probability. Additionally, he uses contingency tables and other methods to explore the probability of God's existence.

=== Part 3: Expectation ===
Chapter 11, What to Expect When You're Expecting to Win the Lottery: This chapter discusses the different probabilities of winning the lottery and expected value as it relates to lottery tickets, including the story of how MIT students managed to "win" the lottery every time in their town. Ellenberg also talks about the law of large numbers again, as well as introducing the Additivity of expected value and the games of Franc-Carreau or the "needle/noodle problem".

Chapter 12, Miss More Planes: The mathematical concepts in this chapter include utility and utils, and the Laffer curve again. This chapter discusses the amount of time spent in the airport as it relates to flights being missed, Daniel Ellsberg, Blaise Pascal's Pensées, the probability of God once more, and the St. Petersburg paradox.

Chapter 13, Where the Train Tracks Meet: This chapter includes discussions about the lottery again, and geometry in renaissance paintings. It introduces some things about coding, including error correcting code, Hamming code, and code words. It also mentions Hamming distance as it relates to language. The mathematical concepts included in this chapter are variance, the projective plane, the Fano plane, and the face-centered cubic lattice.

=== Part 4: Regression ===
Chapter 14, The Triumph of Mediocrity: This chapter discusses mediocrity in everyday business according to Horace Secrist. It also includes discussions about Francis Galton's "Hereditary Genius", and baseball statistics about home runs.

Scatter plot example

Chapter 15, Galton's Ellipse: This chapter focuses on Sir Francis Galton, and his work on scatter plots, as well as the ellipses formed by them, correlation and causation, and the development from linear systems to quadratics. This chapter also addressed conditional and unconditional expectation, regression to the mean, eccentricity, bivariate normal distribution, and dimensions in geometry.

Chapter 16, Does Lung Cancer Make You Smoke Cigarettes: This chapter explores the correlation between smoking cigarettes and lung cancer, using work from R.A. Fisher. It also goes into Berkson's Fallacy, and uses the attractiveness of men to develop the thought, and talks about common effect at the end.

=== Part 5: Existence ===
Chapter 17, There Is No Such Thing As Public Opinion: This chapter delves into the workings of a majority rules system, and points out the contradictions and confusion of it all, ultimately stating that public opinion doesn't exist. It uses many examples to make its point, including different election statistics, the death sentence of an intellectually disabled person, and a case with Justice Antonin Scalia. It also includes mathematical terms/concepts such as independence of irrelevant alternatives, asymmetric domination effect, Australia's single transferable vote, and Condorcet paradoxes.

Chapter 18, "Out of Nothing, I Have Created a Strange New Universe": This chapter talks about János Bolyai, and his work on the parallel postulate. Others mentioned in this chapter include David Hilbert, and Gottlob Frege. It also explored points and lines, Formalism, and what the author calls a "Genius" mentality.

=== How to be Right ===
This last chapter introduces one last concept, ex falso quodlibet, and mentions Theodore Roosevelt, as well as the election between Obama and Romney. The author ends the book with encouraging statements, noting that it's okay to not know everything, and that we all learn from failure. He ends by saying that to love math is to be "touched by fire and bound by reason", and that we should all use it well.

== Reception ==
The Washington Post reported that the book is "brilliantly engaging... part of the sheer intellectual joy of the book is watching the author leap nimbly from topic to topic, comparing slime molds to the Bush–Gore Florida vote, criminology to Beethoven's Ninth Symphony. The final effect is of one enormous mosaic unified by mathematics."

The Wall Street Journal said, "Mr. Ellenberg writes, a kind of 'X-ray specs that reveal hidden structures underneath the messy and chaotic surface of the world." The Guardian wrote, "Ellenberg's prose is a delight – informal and robust, irreverent yet serious."

Business Insider said it's "A collection of fascinating examples of math and its surprising applications...How Not To Be Wrong is full of interesting and weird mathematical tools and observations".

Publishers Weekly writes "Wry, accessible, and entertaining... Ellenberg finds the common-sense math at work in the every day world, and his vivid examples and clear descriptions show how 'math is woven into the way we reason'".

Times Higher Education notes "How Not To Be Wrong is beautifully written, holding the reader's attention throughout with well-chosen material, illuminating exposition, wit, and helpful examples...Ellenberg shares Gardner's remarkable ability to write clearly and entertainingly, bringing in deep mathematical ideas without the reader registering their difficulty".

Salon describes the book as "A poet-mathematician offers an empowering and entertaining primer for the age of Big Data...A rewarding popular math book for just about anyone".

Bill Gates endorsed How Not to Be Wrong and included it in his 2016 "5 Books to Read This Summer" list.
