= Dipak K. Dey =

Indian-American statistician

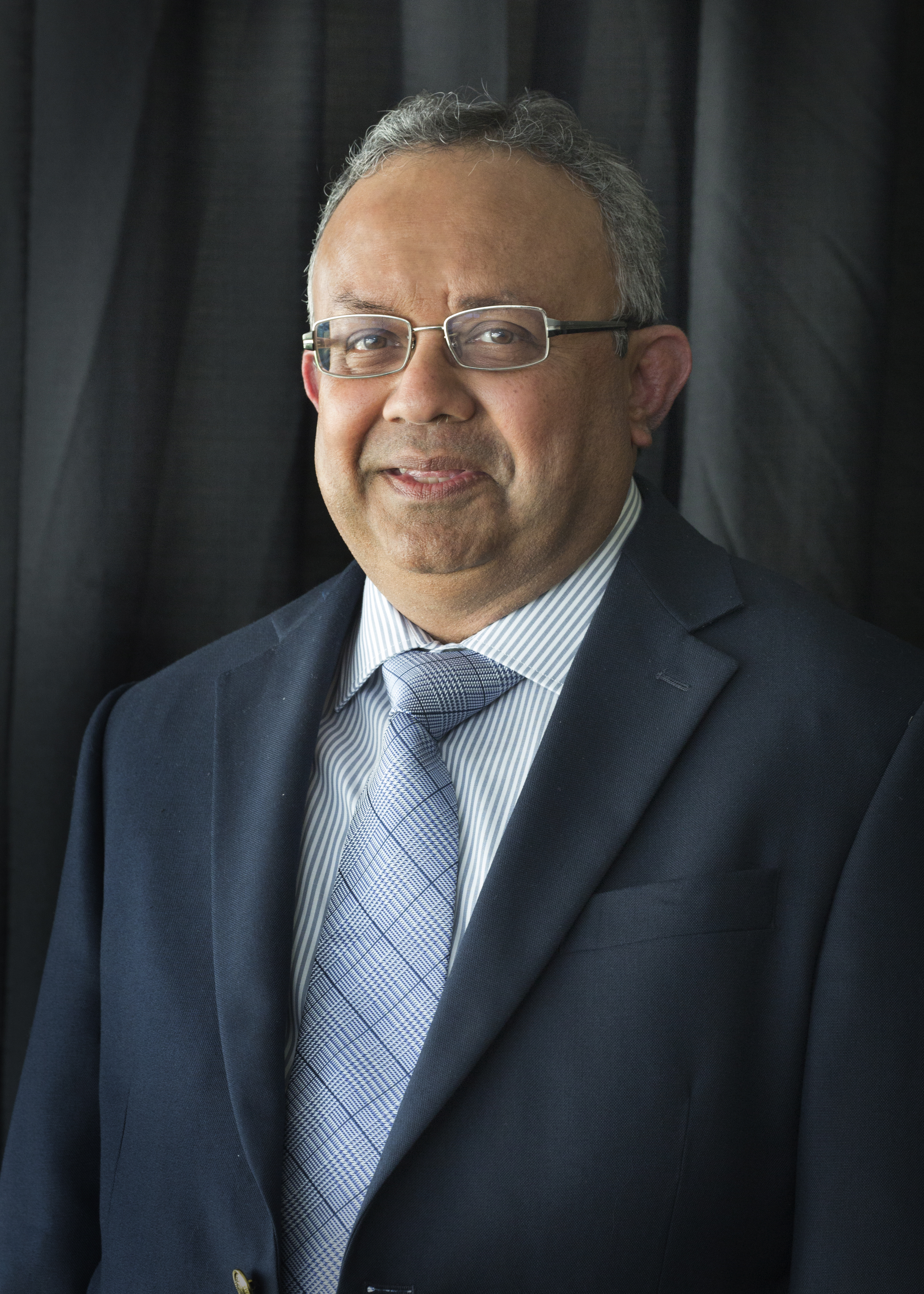
- Born: Dipak Kumar Dey; 12 August 1953 (age 73); Kolkata, India
- Education: Indian Statistical Institute, Kolkata; Purdue University, West Lafayette, IN
- Known for: Bayesian analysis, Decision science
- Awards: Board of Trustees Distinguished Professor Award (2008); Outstanding Statistician Award (2014); Don Owen Award (2017)
- Scientific career
- Fields: Statistics
- Workplaces: University of Connecticut
- Thesis: On the Choice of Coordinates in Simultaneous Estimation of Normal Means (1980)
- Doctoral advisor: Jim Berger
- Doctoral students: Rongwei Fu

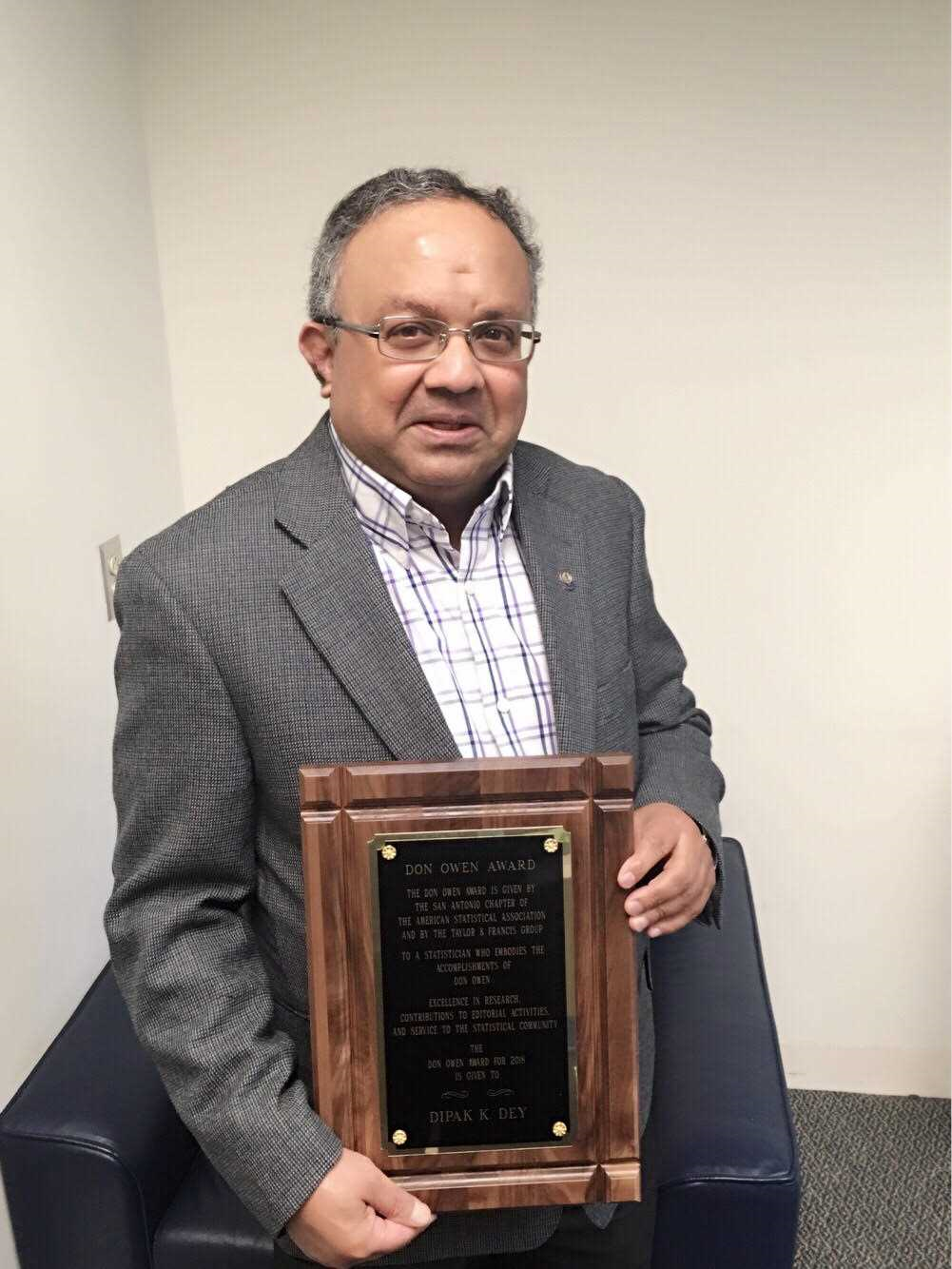
Don Owen Award from American Statistical Association, San Antonio Chapter and Taylor and Francis Group for excellence in research, Contributions to Editorial activities, and Service to the Statistical Community, April, 2018.

Dipak Kumar Dey (born August 12, 1953 in Kolkata, India) is an Indian-American statistician best known for his work on Bayesian methodologies. He is currently the Board of Trustees Distinguished Professor in the Department of Statistics at the University of Connecticut. Dey has an international reputation as a statistician as well as a data scientist. Since he earned a Ph.D. degree in statistics from Purdue University in 1980, Dey has made tremendous contributions to the development of modern statistics, especially in Bayesian analysis, decision science and model selection. Dey has published more than 10 books and edited volumes, and over 260 research articles in peer-refereed national and international journals. In addition, the statistical methodologies that he has developed has found wide applications in a plethora of interdisciplinary and applied fields, such as biometry and bioinformatics, genetics, econometrics, environmental science, and social science. Dey has supervised 40 Ph.D. students, and presented more than 200 professional talks in colloquia, seminars and conferences all over the world. During his career, Dey has been a visiting professor or scholar at many institutions or research centers around the world, such as Macquarie University (Sydney, Australia), Pontificia Universidad Católica de Chile, (Santiago, Chile), University of São Paulo (São Paulo, Brazil), University of British Columbia (Vancouver, Canada), Statistical and Applied Mathematical Sciences Institute (Research Triangle Park, NC), etc. Dey is an elected fellow of the American Association for the Advancement of Science, the American Statistical Association, the Institute of Mathematical Statistics, the International Society for Bayesian Analysis and the International Statistical Institute.

== Early life and education ==
Dey was born in Kolkata, India in 1953, the son of Debendranath and Ranuka Dey. He attended Ballygunge Government High School (Kolkata, India) and won the National Merit Scholarship. In 1970, Dey joined the Indian Statistical Institute, where he ultimately earned a bachelor's degree (with honors in 1974), and a master's degree (in 1975), both in Statistics. Afterwards, Dey moved to the United States and attended Purdue University (West Lafayette, IN) for higher education. He obtained an M.S. degree (in statistics) and a Ph.D. degree (also in statistics), respectively in 1977 and 1980. At Purdue University, Dey's advisor was Jim Berger. Dey's dissertation focused on Bayes approach where prior distributions were constructed from the structure of sampling distributions and/or of statistical testing hypotheses, with criticisms of the use of p-values and critical levels. Dey's research also involves simultaneous estimation problems, Stein-type estimation and robust generalized Bayes approach where prior distributions were constructed under various structures.

== Career ==
After completing visiting positions at Stanford University and the University of Kentucky, Dey joined Texas Tech University in 1982 as an assistant professor of mathematics. Later in 1985, Dey moved to the University of Connecticut as an associate professor of statistics. He served as the chair of the department from 1997 to 2011. In the next five years, Dey was appointed the associate dean of the College of Liberal Arts and Science at the University of Connecticut.

== Contributions to science ==
During his career at the University of Connecticut, Dey has worked on a large number of problems on Bayesian analysis and authored journal articles for developing theories and methods related to Bayesian modeling and inference on various types of data, such as survival, image, spatial and temporal data. His contributions to science is not only reflected in the methodological development in statistics, but also in the wide-ranging applications in many other disciplines, like public health, medicine, ecology, economics and social science.

== Awards, honors and services ==
Dey has received numerous awards and honors thanks to his significant contributions to science:

- Board of Trustees, The Indian Statistical Association
- Don Owen Award, The San Antonio Chapter of the American Statistical Association
- Outstanding Statistician Award, The Connecticut Chapter of the American Statistical Association
- Edward C. Marth Mentorship Award, University of Connecticut
- Board of Trustees Distinguished Professor Award, University of Connecticut
- Elected fellow of the American Association for the Advancement of Science
- Elected member of the Connecticut Academy of Arts and Sciences
- Fellow of the American Statistical Association
- Fellow of the Institute of Mathematical Statistics
- Elected member of the International Statistical Institute

Dey also served as an associate editor for many statistical journals, such as the Journal of the American Statistical Association (1997–1999) and the Journal of Statistical Planning and Inference (2001–2003). Dey is the editor in chief of Sankhya since 2016.
