= Schonlau =

Schonlau is a surname. Notable people with this name include:

- Matthias Schonlau (born 1967), German statistician and actuarial scientist
- Ree Schonlau (born 1946), American artist, arts administrator, and arts consultant
- Sebastian Schonlau (born 1994), German footballer
