= Jae-Kwang Kim =

South Korean statistician (born 1968)

- 김재광
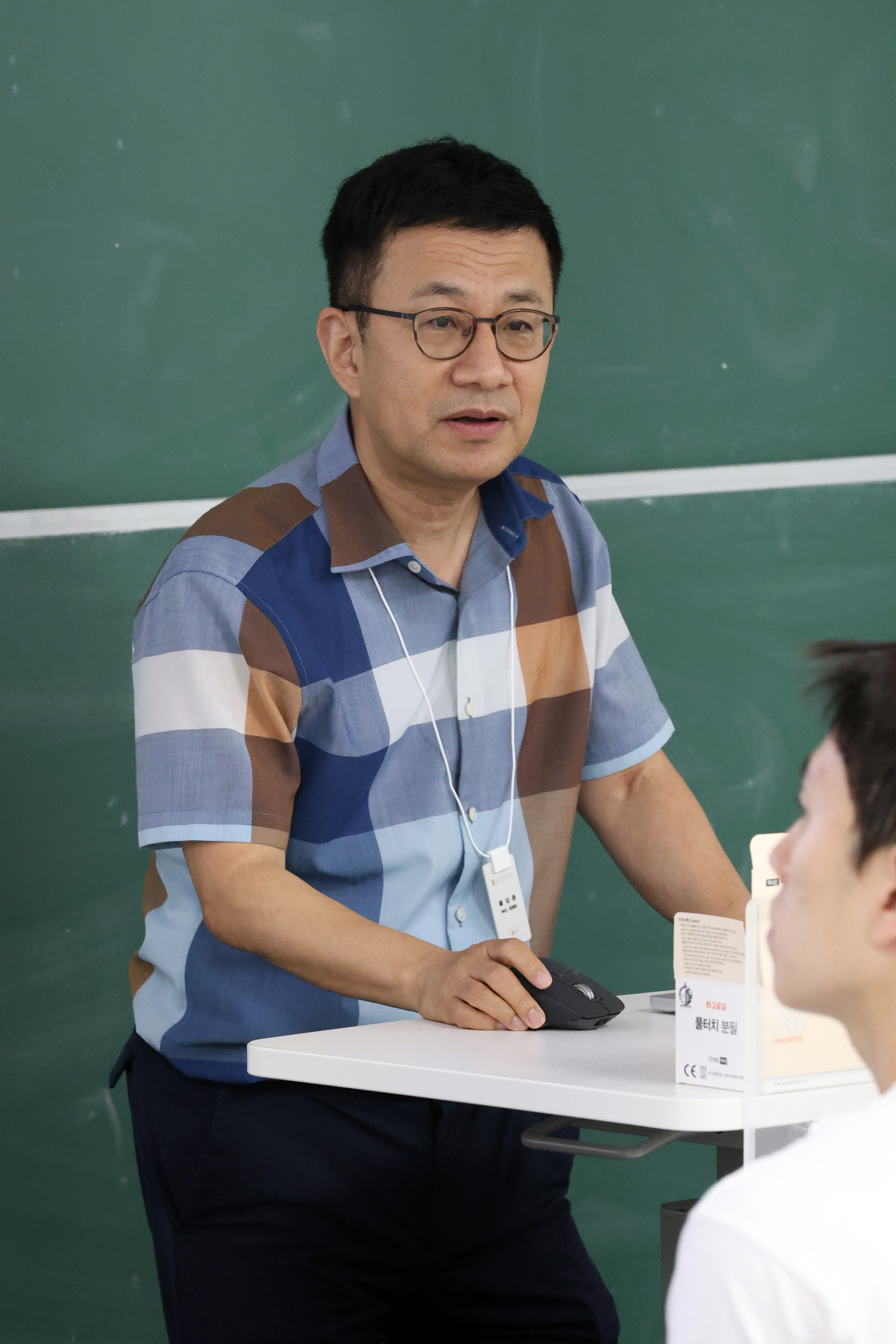
- Born: September 18, 1968
- Education: Ph.D.
- Alma mater: Iowa State University, Seoul National University
- Scientific career
- Institutions: Iowa State University, KAIST, Yonsei University, Hankuk University of Foreign Studies
- Doctoral advisor: Wayne Fuller
- Doctoral students: Shu Yang

Korean name
- Hangul: 김재광
- RR: Gim Jaegwang
- MR: Kim Chaegwang
- Website: https://sites.google.com/view/jaekwangkim

Jae-Kwang Kim (Korean: 김재광; born 18 September 1968) is a professor in Statistics Department at Iowa State University.

== Education ==
Kim earned a Bachelor's of Science from Seoul National University in 1991, followed by a Master's of Science in 1993. He then completed a doctorate at Iowa State University in 2000, supervised by Wayne Fuller.

== Career ==
Kim returned to South Korea, teaching at the Hankuk University of Foreign Studies between 2002 and 2003, and Yonsei University between 2004 and 2008, before rejoining Iowa State as a faculty member. From 2016 to 2018, Kim also taught at KAIST. In 2021, Kim was elected president-elect of the Korean International Statistical Society. He is also a senior fellow of the National Institute of Statistical Sciences.

== Awards and honors ==
Kim is a 2012 fellow of the American Statistical Association. The Institute of Mathematical Statistics elected him to an equivalent honor in 2020.
