= Andreea Erciulescu =

Romanian statistician

Andreea Luisa Erciulescu is a Romanian statistician who has worked in agricultural and official statistics, small area estimation, and survey methodology. She is an associate vice president for statistics and data science at Westat.

== Education and career ==
Erciulescu majored in mathematics at Colorado State University, supported by a scholarship from the Romanian government and graduating in 2011. During her studies there, she discovered an interest in statistics, and won in 2010 an AMS undergraduate poster presentation award for Solving Kakuro Puzzles. She continued at Iowa State University for graduate study in statistics, where she received a master's degree and completed her Ph.D., in 2015. Her dissertation, Small area prediction based on unit level models when the covariate mean is measured with error, was supervised by Wayne Fuller.

She was a postdoctoral researcher at the National Institute of Statistical Sciences from 2015 to 2018, working there on projects associated with the National Agricultural Statistics Service. In 2018 she moved to Westat as a senior statistician, and has since become a vice president.

== Recognition ==
Erciulescu is an Elected Member of the International Statistical Institute. She was elected to the 2025 class of Fellows of the American Statistical Association.

She was a third-place recipient of the 2022 Prize for Young Statisticians of the International Association for Official Statistics, the first US-based statistician to receive this award.
