= Regression toward the mean =

Statistical phenomenon

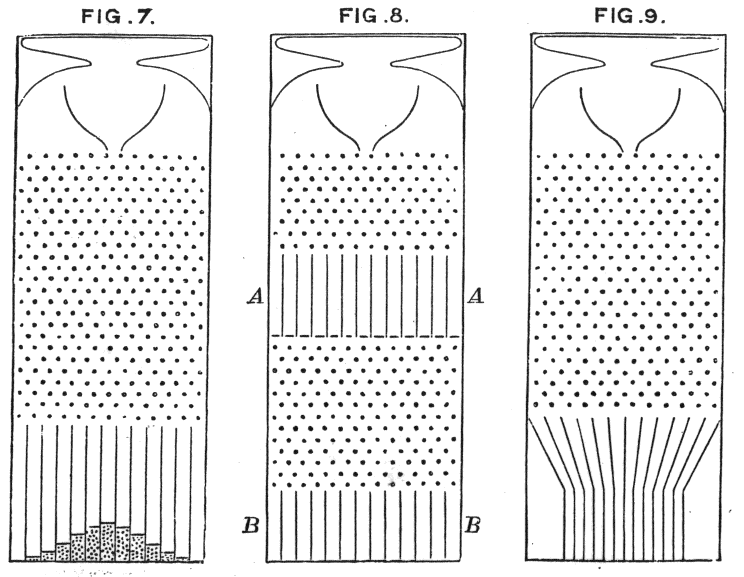
Galton's experimental setup

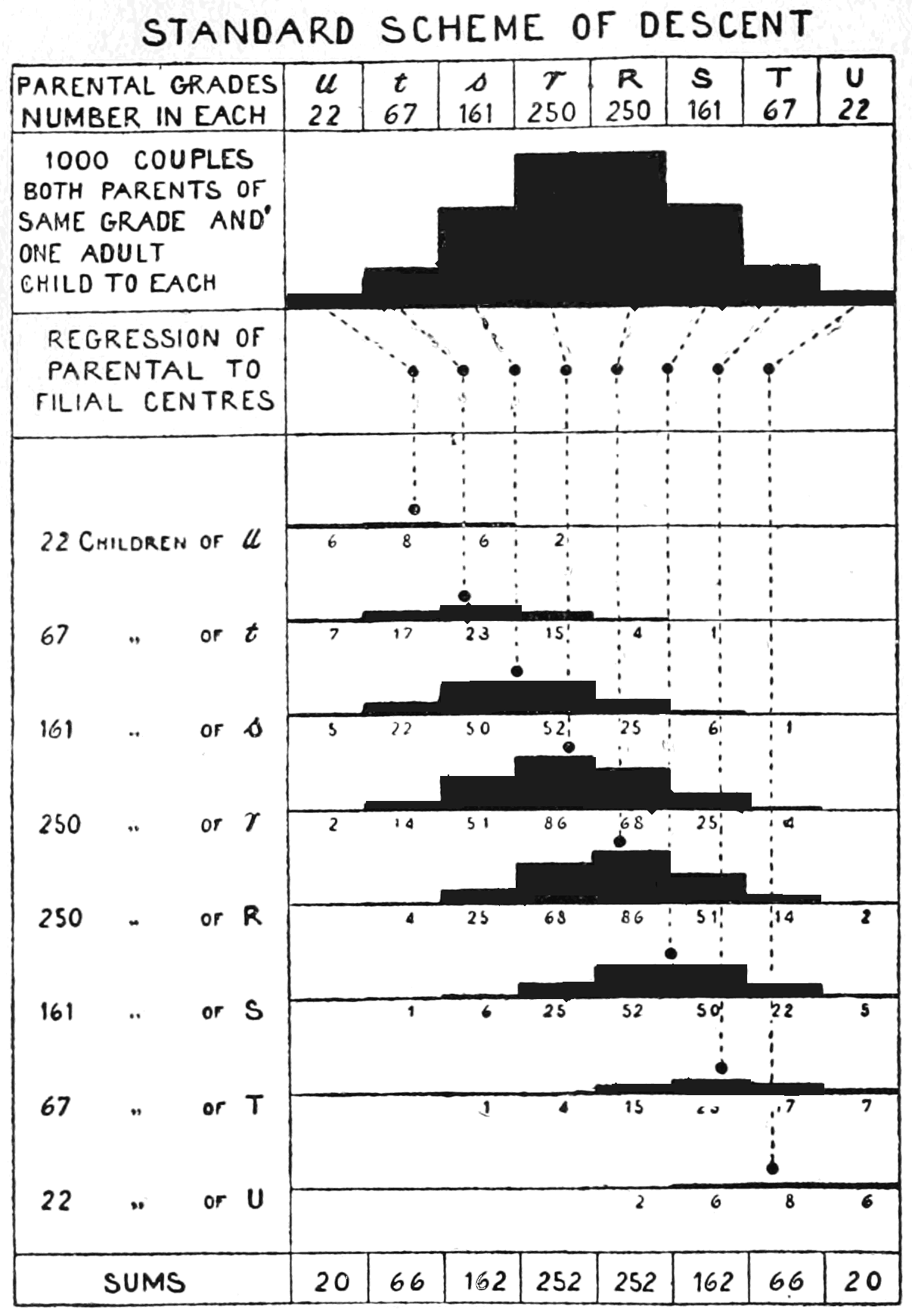
"Standard eugenics scheme of descent" – early application of Galton's insight

In statistics, regression toward the mean (also called regression to the mean, reversion to the mean, and reversion to mediocrity) is the phenomenon where if one sample of a random variable is extreme, the next sampling of the same random variable is likely to be closer to its mean. Furthermore, when many random variables are sampled and the most extreme results are intentionally picked out, it refers to the fact that (in many cases) a second sampling of these picked-out variables will result in "less extreme" results, closer to the initial mean of all of the variables.

Mathematically, the strength of this "regression" effect is dependent on whether or not all of the random variables are drawn from the same distribution, or if there are genuine differences in the underlying distributions for each random variable. In the first case, the "regression" effect is statistically likely to occur, but in the second case, it may occur less strongly or not at all.

Regression toward the mean is thus a useful concept to consider when designing any scientific experiment, data analysis, or test, which intentionally selects the most extreme events - it indicates that follow-up checks may be useful in order to avoid jumping to false conclusions about these events; they may be genuine extreme events, a completely meaningless selection due to statistical noise, or a mix of the two cases.

== Conceptual examples ==
=== Simple example: students taking a test ===
Consider a class of students taking a 100-item true/false test on a subject. Suppose that all students choose randomly on all questions. Then, each student's score would be a realization of one of a set of independent and identically distributed random variables, with an expected mean of 50. Naturally, some students will score substantially above 50 and some substantially below 50 just by chance. If one selects only the top scoring 10% of the students and gives them a second test on which they again choose randomly on all items, the mean score would again be expected to be close to 50. Thus the mean of these students would "regress" all the way back to the mean of all students who took the original test. No matter what a student scores on the original test, the best prediction of their score on the second test is 50.

If choosing answers to the test questions was not random – i.e. if there were no luck (good or bad) or random guessing involved in the answers supplied by the students – then all students would be expected to score the same on the second test as they scored on the original test, and there would be no regression toward the mean.

Most realistic situations fall between these two extremes: for example, one might consider exam scores as a combination of skill and luck. In this case, the subset of students scoring above average would be composed of those who were skilled and had not especially bad luck, together with those who were unskilled, but were extremely lucky. On a retest of this subset, the unskilled will be unlikely to repeat their lucky break, while the skilled will have a second chance to have bad luck. Hence, those who did well previously are unlikely to do quite as well in the second test even if the original cannot be replicated.

The following is an example of this second kind of regression toward the mean. A class of students takes two editions of the same test on two successive days. It has frequently been observed that the worst performers on the first day will tend to improve their scores on the second day, and the best performers on the first day will tend to do worse on the second day. The phenomenon occurs because student scores are determined in part by underlying ability and in part by chance. For the first test, some will be lucky, and score more than their ability, and some will be unlucky and score less than their ability. Some of the lucky students on the first test will be lucky again on the second test, but more of them will have (for them) average or below average scores. Therefore, a student who was lucky and over-performed their ability on the first test is more likely to have a worse score on the second test than a better score. Similarly, students who unluckily score less than their ability on the first test will tend to see their scores increase on the second test. The larger the influence of luck in producing an extreme event, the less likely the luck will repeat itself in multiple events.

=== Other examples ===
If you have a pool of green balls and a pool of blue balls, and choose one ball until you have six balls, there is a 1/64 chance you will have six green balls, a 6/64 chance you will have five green balls and one blue ball, 15/64 you will have four green balls and two blue balls, and a 20/64 you will have three green balls and three blue balls. If you grab a different pool of balls you are more likely to have around 1/2 of the balls with the same colour.

If your favourite sports team won the championship last year, what does that mean for their chances for winning next season? To the extent this result is due to skill (the team is in good condition, with a top coach, etc.), their win signals that it is more likely they will win again next year. But the greater the extent this is due to luck (other teams embroiled in a drug scandal, favourable draw, draft picks turned out to be productive, etc.), the less likely it is they will win again next year.

If a business organisation has a highly profitable quarter, despite the underlying reasons for its performance being unchanged, it is likely to do less well the next quarter.

Baseball players who hit well in their rookie season are likely to do worse their second; the "sophomore slump". Similarly, regression toward the mean is an explanation for the Sports Illustrated cover jinx — periods of exceptional performance which results in a cover feature are likely to be followed by periods of more mediocre performance, giving the impression that appearing on the cover causes an athlete's decline.

== History ==
=== Discovery ===
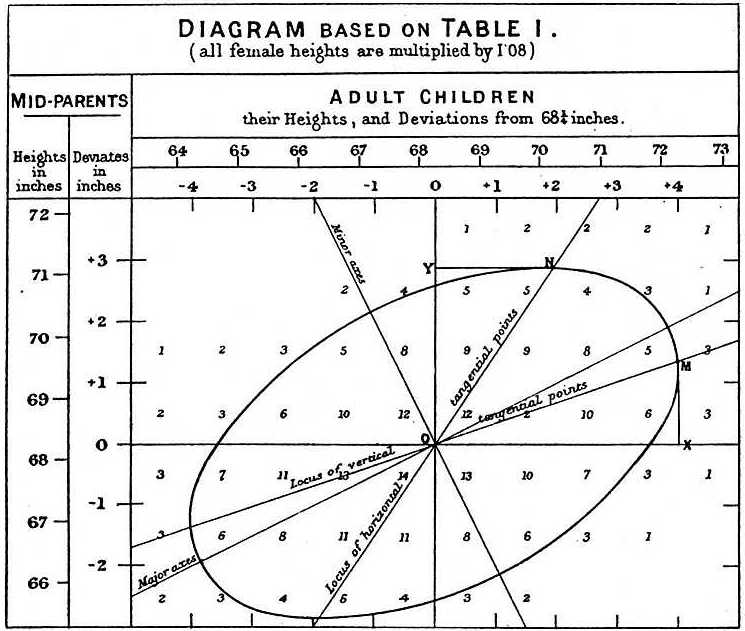
Francis Galton's 1886 illustration of the correlation between the heights of adults and their parents. The observation that adult children's heights tended to deviate less from the mean height than their parents suggested the concept of "regression toward the mean", giving regression analysis its name.

The concept of regression comes from genetics and was popularized by Sir Francis Galton during the late 19th century with the publication of Regression towards mediocrity in hereditary stature. Galton observed that extreme characteristics (e.g., height) in parents are not passed on completely to their offspring. Rather, the characteristics in the offspring regress toward a mediocre point (a point which has since been identified as the mean). By measuring the heights of hundreds of people, he was able to quantify regression to the mean, and estimate the size of the effect. Galton wrote that, "the average regression of the offspring is a constant fraction of their respective mid-parental deviations". This means that the difference between a child and its parents for some characteristic is proportional to its parents' deviation from typical people in the population. If its parents are each two inches taller than the averages for men and women, then, on average, the offspring will be shorter than its parents by some factor (which, today, we would call one minus the regression coefficient) times two inches. For height, Galton estimated this coefficient to be about 2/3: the height of an individual will measure around a midpoint that is two thirds of the parents' deviation from the population average.

Galton also published these results using the simpler example of pellets falling through a Galton board to form a normal distribution centred directly under their entrance point. These pellets might then be released down into a second gallery corresponding to a second measurement. Galton then asked the reverse question: "From where did these pellets come?"

The answer was not 'on average directly above'. Rather it was 'on average, more towards the middle', for the simple reason that there were more pellets above it towards the middle that could wander left than there were in the left extreme that could wander to the right, inwards.

=== Evolving usage of the term ===
Galton coined the term "regression" to describe an observable fact in the inheritance of multi-factorial quantitative genetic traits: namely that traits of the offspring of parents who lie at the tails of the distribution often tend to lie closer to the centre, the mean, of the distribution. He quantified this trend, and in doing so invented linear regression analysis, thus laying the groundwork for much of modern statistical modeling. Since then, the term "regression" has been used in other contexts, and it may be used by modern statisticians to describe phenomena such as sampling bias which have little to do with Galton's original observations in the field of genetics.

Galton's explanation for the regression phenomenon he observed in biology was stated as follows: "A child inherits partly from his parents, partly from his ancestors. Speaking generally, the further his genealogy goes back, the more numerous and varied will his ancestry become, until they cease to differ from any equally numerous sample taken at haphazard from the race at large." Galton's statement requires some clarification in light of knowledge of genetics: Children receive genetic material from their parents, but hereditary information (e.g. values of inherited traits) from earlier ancestors can be passed through their parents (and may not have been expressed in their parents). The mean for the trait may be nonrandom and determined by selection pressure, but the distribution of values around the mean reflects a normal statistical distribution.

If two parents share the same haplotype and have one dominant allele and one recessive allele for each gene then most of their offspring will have an intermediate phenotype with some trending towards the dominant phenotype or the recessive phenotype.

The population-genetic phenomenon studied by Galton is a special case of "regression to the mean"; the term is often used to describe many statistical phenomena in which data exhibit a normal distribution around a mean.

== Importance ==
Regression toward the mean is a significant consideration in the design of experiments.

Take a hypothetical example of 1,000 individuals of a similar age who were examined and scored on the risk of experiencing a heart attack. Statistics could be used to measure the success of an intervention on the 50 who were rated at the greatest risk, as measured by a test with a degree of uncertainty. The intervention could be a change in diet, exercise, or a drug treatment. Even if the interventions are worthless, the test group would be expected to show an improvement on their next physical exam, because of regression toward the mean. The best way to combat this effect is to divide the group randomly into a treatment group that receives the treatment, and a group that does not. The treatment would then be judged effective only if the treatment group improves more than the untreated group.

Alternatively, a group of disadvantaged children could be tested to identify the ones with most college potential. The top 1% could be identified and supplied with special enrichment courses, tutoring, counseling and computers. Even if the program is effective, their average scores may well be less when the test is repeated a year later. However, in these circumstances it may be considered unethical to have a control group of disadvantaged children whose special needs are ignored. A mathematical calculation for shrinkage can adjust for this effect, although it will not be as reliable as the control group method (see also Stein's example).

The effect can also be exploited for general inference and estimation. The hottest place in the country today is more likely to be cooler tomorrow than hotter, as compared to today. The best performing mutual fund over the last three years is more likely to see relative performance decline than improve over the next three years. The most successful Hollywood actor of this year is likely to have less gross, rather than more gross, for their next movie. The baseball player with the highest batting average partway through the season is more likely to have a lower average than a higher average over the remainder of the season.

=== Misunderstandings ===
The concept of regression toward the mean can be misused very easily.

In the student test example above, it was assumed implicitly that what was being measured did not change between the two measurements. Suppose, however, that the course was pass/fail and students were required to score above 70 on both tests to pass. Then the students who scored under 70 the first time would have no incentive to do well, and might score worse on average the second time. The students just over 70, on the other hand, would have a strong incentive to study and concentrate while taking the test. In that case one might see movement away from 70, scores below it getting lower and scores above it getting higher. It is possible for changes between the measurement times to augment, offset or reverse the statistical tendency to regress toward the mean.

Statistical regression toward the mean is not a causal phenomenon. A student with the worst score on the test on the first day will not necessarily increase their score substantially on the second day due to the effect. On average, the worst scorers improve, but that is only true because the worst scorers are more likely to have been unlucky than lucky. To the extent that a score is determined randomly, or that a score has random variation or error, as opposed to being determined by the student's academic ability or being a "true value", the phenomenon will have an effect. A classic mistake in this regard was in education. The students that received praise for good work were noticed to do more poorly on the next measure, and the students who were punished for poor work were noticed to do better on the next measure. The educators decided to stop praising and keep punishing on this basis. Such a decision was a mistake, because regression toward the mean is not based on cause and effect, but rather on random error in a natural distribution around a mean.

Although extreme individual measurements regress toward the mean, the second sample of measurements will be no closer to the mean than the first. Consider the students again. Suppose the tendency of extreme individuals is to regress 10% of the way toward the mean of 80, so a student who scored 100 the first day is expected to score 98 the second day, and a student who scored 70 the first day is expected to score 71 the second day. Those expectations are closer to the mean than the first day scores. But the second day scores will vary around their expectations; some will be higher and some will be lower. For extreme individuals, we expect the second score to be closer to the mean than the first score, but for all individuals, we expect the distribution of distances from the mean to be the same on both sets of measurements.

Related to the point above, regression toward the mean works equally well in both directions. We expect the student with the highest test score on the second day to have done worse on the first day. And if we compare the best student on the first day to the best student on the second day, regardless of whether it is the same individual or not, there is no tendency to regress toward the mean going in either direction. We expect the best scores on both days to be equally far from the mean.

=== Regression fallacies ===
Many phenomena tend to be attributed to the wrong causes when regression to the mean is not taken into account.

An extreme example is Horace Secrist's 1933 book The Triumph of Mediocrity in Business, in which the statistics professor collected mountains of data to prove that the profit rates of competitive businesses tend toward the average over time. In fact, there is no such effect; the variability of profit rates is almost constant over time. Secrist had only described the common regression toward the mean. One exasperated reviewer, Harold Hotelling, likened the book to "proving the multiplication table by arranging elephants in rows and columns, and then doing the same for numerous other kinds of animals".

The calculation and interpretation of "improvement scores" on standardized educational tests in Massachusetts probably provides another example of the regression fallacy. In 1999, schools were given improvement goals. For each school, the Department of Education tabulated the difference in the average score achieved by students in 1999 and in 2000. It was quickly noted that most of the worst-performing schools had met their goals, which the Department of Education took as confirmation of the soundness of their policies. However, it was also noted that many of the supposedly best schools in the Commonwealth, such as Brookline High School (with 18 National Merit Scholarship finalists) were declared to have failed. As in many cases involving statistics and public policy, the issue is debated, but "improvement scores" were not announced in subsequent years and the findings appear to be a case of regression to the mean.

The psychologist Daniel Kahneman, winner of the 2002 Nobel Memorial Prize in Economic Sciences, pointed out that regression to the mean might explain why rebukes can seem to improve performance, while praise seems to backfire.

I had the most satisfying Eureka experience of my career while attempting to teach flight instructors that praise is more effective than punishment for promoting skill-learning. When I had finished my enthusiastic speech, one of the most seasoned instructors in the audience raised his hand and made his own short speech, which began by conceding that positive reinforcement might be good for the birds, but went on to deny that it was optimal for flight cadets. He said, "On many occasions I have praised flight cadets for clean execution of some aerobatic maneuver, and in general when they try it again, they do worse. On the other hand, I have often screamed at cadets for bad execution, and in general they do better the next time. So please don't tell us that reinforcement works and punishment does not, because the opposite is the case." This was a joyous moment, in which I understood an important truth about the world: because we tend to reward others when they do well and punish them when they do badly, and because there is regression to the mean, it is part of the human condition that we are statistically punished for rewarding others and rewarded for punishing them. I immediately arranged a demonstration in which each participant tossed two coins at a target behind his back, without any feedback. We measured the distances from the target and could see that those who had done best the first time had mostly deteriorated on their second try, and vice versa. But I knew that this demonstration would not undo the effects of lifelong exposure to a perverse contingency.

The regression fallacy is also explained in Rolf Dobelli's The Art of Thinking Clearly.

UK law enforcement policies have encouraged the visible siting of static or mobile speed cameras at accident blackspots. This policy was justified by a perception that there is a corresponding reduction in serious road traffic accidents after a camera is set up. However, statisticians have pointed out that, although there is a net benefit in lives saved, failure to take into account the effects of regression to the mean results in the beneficial effects being overstated.

Statistical analysts have long recognized the effect of regression to the mean in sports; they even have a special name for it: the "sophomore slump". For example, Carmelo Anthony of the NBA's Denver Nuggets had an outstanding rookie season in 2004. It was so outstanding that he could not be expected to repeat it: in 2005, Anthony's numbers had dropped from his rookie season. The reasons for the "sophomore slump" abound, as sports rely on adjustment and counter-adjustment, but luck-based excellence as a rookie is as good a reason as any. Regression to the mean in sports performance may also explain the apparent "Sports Illustrated cover jinx" and the "Madden Curse". John Hollinger has an alternative name for the phenomenon of regression to the mean: the "fluke rule", while Bill James calls it the "Plexiglas Principle".

Because popular lore has focused on regression toward the mean as an account of declining performance of athletes from one season to the next, it has usually overlooked the fact that such regression can also account for improved performance. For example, if one looks at the batting average of Major League Baseball players in one season, those whose batting average was above the league mean tend to regress downward toward the mean the following year, while those whose batting average was below the mean tend to progress upward toward the mean the following year.

=== Other statistical phenomena ===
Regression toward the mean simply says that, following an extreme random event, the next random event is likely to be less extreme. In no sense does the future event "compensate for" or "even out" the previous event, though this is assumed in the gambler's fallacy (and the variant law of averages). Similarly, the law of large numbers states that in the long term, the average will tend toward the expected value, but makes no statement about individual trials. For example, following a run of 10 heads on a flip of a fair coin (a rare, extreme event), regression to the mean states that the next run of heads will likely be less than 10, while the law of large numbers states that in the long term, this event will likely average out, and the average fraction of heads will tend to 1/2. By contrast, the gambler's fallacy incorrectly assumes that the coin is now "due" for a run of tails to balance out.

The opposite effect is regression to the tail, resulting from a distribution with non-vanishing probability density toward infinity.

== Definition for simple linear regression of data points ==
This is the definition of regression toward the mean that closely follows Sir Francis Galton's original usage.

Suppose there are n data points {y_{i}, x_{i}}, for i = 1, 2, ..., n. We want to find the equation of the regression line, i.e. the straight line
$$y = \alpha + \beta x\,,$$
which would provide a best fit for the data points. (A straight line may not be the appropriate regression curve for the given data points.) Here the best will be understood as in the least-squares approach: such a line that minimizes the sum of squared residuals of the linear regression model. In other words, numbers α and β solve the following minimization problem:

- Find $\min_{\alpha,\,\beta}Q(\alpha,\beta)$, where $Q(\alpha,\beta) = \sum_{i=1}^n\hat{\varepsilon}_i^{\,2} = \sum_{i=1}^n (y_i - \alpha - \beta x_i)^2\$

Using calculus it can be shown that the values of α and β that minimize the objective function Q are
$$\begin{align}
& \hat\beta = \frac{ \sum_{i=1}^{n} (x_{i}-\bar{x})(y_{i}-\bar{y}) }{ \sum_{i=1}^{n} (x_{i}-\bar{x})^2 }
= \frac{ \overline{xy} - \bar{x}\bar{y} }{ \overline{x^2} - \bar{x}^2 }
= \frac{ \operatorname{Cov}[x,y] }{ \operatorname{Var}[x] }
= r_{xy} \frac{s_y}{s_x}, \\
& \hat\alpha = \bar{y} - \hat\beta\,\bar{x},
\end{align}$$

where r_{xy} is the sample correlation coefficient between x and y, s_{x} is the standard deviation of x, and s_{y} is correspondingly the standard deviation of y. Horizontal bar over a variable means the sample average of that variable. For example: $\overline{xy} = \tfrac{1}{n}\textstyle\sum_{i=1}^n x_iy_i\ .$

Substituting the above expressions for and into y = α + βx yields fitted values
$$\hat y = \hat\alpha + \hat\beta x, \,$$

which yields
$$\frac{ \hat y-\bar{y}}{s_y} = r_{xy} \frac{ x-\bar{x}}{s_x}$$

This shows the role r_{xy} plays in the regression line of standardized data points.

If −1 < r_{xy} < 1, then we say that the data points exhibit regression toward the mean. In other words, if linear regression is the appropriate model for a set of data points whose sample correlation coefficient is not perfect, then there is regression toward the mean. The predicted (or fitted) standardized value of y is closer to its mean than the standardized value of x is to its mean.

== Definitions for bivariate distribution with identical marginal distributions ==
=== Restrictive definition ===
Let X_{1}, X_{2} be random variables with identical marginal distributions with mean μ. In this formalization, the bivariate distribution of X_{1} and X_{2} is said to exhibit regression toward the mean if, for every number c > μ, we have
$$\mu\le\operatorname{E}[X_2\vert X_1=c] < c\,,$$
with the reverse inequalities holding for c < μ.

The following is an informal description of the above definition. Consider a population of widgets. Each widget has two numbers, X_{1} and X_{2} – say, its left span (X_{1}) and right span (X_{2}). Suppose that the probability distributions of X_{1} and X_{2} in the population are identical, and that the means of X_{1} and X_{2} are both μ. We now take a random widget from the population, and denote its X_{1} value by c (c may be greater than, equal to, or smaller than μ). We have no access to the value of this widget's X_{2} yet. Let d denote the expected value of X_{2} of this particular widget; i.e., let d denote the average value of X_{2} of all widgets in the population with X_{1} = c. If the following condition is true:

- whatever the value c is, d lies between μ and c (i.e., d is closer to μ than c is),

then we say that X_{1} and X_{2} show regression toward the mean.

This definition accords closely with the current common usage, evolved from Galton's original usage, of the term "regression toward the mean". It is "restrictive" in the sense that not every bivariate distribution with identical marginal distributions exhibits regression toward the mean (under this definition).

==== Theorem ====
If a pair (X, Y) of random variables follows a bivariate normal distribution, then the conditional mean E(Y | X) is a linear function of X. The correlation coefficient r between X and Y, along with the marginal means and variances of X and Y, determines this linear relationship:
$$\frac{\operatorname{E}(Y\vert X)-\operatorname{E}[Y]}{\sigma_y} = r\frac{X-\operatorname{E}[X]}{\sigma_x},$$

where E[X] and E[Y] are the expected values of X and Y, respectively, and σ_{x} and σ_{y} are the standard deviations of X and Y, respectively.

Hence the conditional expected value of Y, given that X is t standard deviations above its mean (and that includes the case where it's below its mean, when t < 0), is rt standard deviations above the mean of Y. Since |r| ≤ 1, Y is no farther from the mean than X is, as measured in the number of standard deviations.

Hence, if 0 ≤ r < 1, then (X, Y) shows regression toward the mean (by this definition).

=== General definition ===
The following definition of reversion toward the mean has been proposed by Samuels as an alternative to the more restrictive definition of regression toward the mean above.

Let X_{1} and X_{2} be random variables with identical marginal distributions with mean μ. In this formalization, the bivariate distribution of X_{1} and X_{2} is said to exhibit reversion toward the mean if, for every number c, we have
$$\begin{align}
\mu &\le \operatorname{E}[X_2 \vert X_1 > c] < \operatorname{E}[X_1 \vert X_1 > c], \text{ and} \\
\mu &\ge \operatorname{E}[X_2 \vert X_1 < c] > \operatorname{E}[X_1 \vert X_1 < c].
\end{align}$$

This definition is "general" in the sense that every bivariate distribution with identical marginal distributions exhibits reversion toward the mean, provided some weak criteria are satisfied (non-degeneracy and weak positive dependence as described in Samuels's paper).

== Alternative definition in financial usage ==
Jeremy Siegel uses the term "return to the mean" to describe a financial time series in which "returns can be very unstable in the short run but very stable in the long run." More quantitatively, it is one in which the standard deviation of average annual returns declines faster than the inverse of the holding period, implying that the process is not a random walk, but that periods of lower returns are systematically followed by compensating periods of higher returns, as is the case in many seasonal businesses, for example.

== See also ==
- Hardy–Weinberg principle – Principle in genetics
- Internal validity – Extent to which a piece of evidence supports a claim about cause and effect
- Law of large numbers – Averages of repeated trials converge to the expected value
- Martingale (probability theory) – Model in probability theory
- Regression dilution – Statistical bias in linear regressions
- Selection bias – Bias in a statistical analysis due to non-random selection
