= James O. Berger =

American statistician

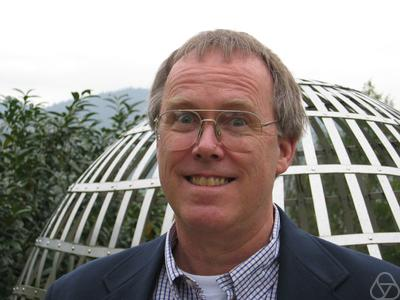
- Berger at the Oberwolfach Research Institute for Mathematics in 2005
- Born: James Orvis Berger; 6 April 1950 (age 76); Minneapolis, Minnesota
- Education: Cornell University
- Known for: Bayesian inference, Statistical hypothesis testing, Computer experiments
- Awards: COPSS Presidents' Award (1985); National Academy of Sciences (2003); Guggenheim Fellowship; IMS R. A. Fisher Lectureship
- Scientific career
- Fields: Statistics, Bayesian inference
- Workplaces: Purdue University; Duke University
- Thesis: Admissibility in Location Parameter Problems (1974)
- Doctoral advisor: Lawrence D. Brown
- Doctoral students: Dipak K. Dey

James Orvis Berger (born April 6, 1950, in Minneapolis, Minnesota) is an American statistician best known for his work on Bayesian statistics and decision theory. He won the COPSS Presidents' Award, one of the two highest awards in statistics, in 1985 at the age of 35. He received a Ph.D. in mathematics from Cornell University in 1974. He was a faculty member in the Department of Statistics at Purdue University until 1997, at which time he moved to the Institute of Statistics and Decision Sciences (now the Department of Statistical Science) at Duke University, where he is currently the Arts and Sciences Professor of Statistics. He was also director of the Statistical and Applied Mathematical Sciences Institute from 2002 to 2010, and has been a visiting professor at the University of Chicago since 2011. In 2024–25, Berger has been elected as a Hagler Fellow at the Hagler Institute for Advanced Study at Texas A&M University.

== Contributions to science ==
Berger has worked on the decision theoretic bases of Bayesian inference, including advances on the Stein phenomenon during and after his thesis. He has also greatly contributed to advances in the so-called objective Bayes approach where prior distributions are constructed from the structure of the sampling distributions and/or of frequentist properties. He is also recognized for his analysis of the opposition between Bayesian and frequentist visions on testing statistical hypotheses, with criticisms of the use of p-values and critical levels.

== Awards and honors ==
Berger has received numerous awards for his work: Guggenheim Fellowship, the COPSS Presidents' Award and the R. A. Fisher Lectureship. He was elected as a Fellow of the American Statistical Association and to the National Academy of Sciences in 2003. In 2004, he was awarded an honorary Doctor of Science degree by Purdue University.

== Bibliography ==
- Berger, James O. (1985). Statistical Decision Theory and Bayesian Analysis. Berlin: Springer-Verlag. ISBN 978-0-387-96098-2.
- Wolpert, Robert L.; Berger, James O. (1988). The Likelihood Principle. Institute of Mathematical Statistics. ISBN 978-0-940600-13-3.
