= Geoffrey Shepherd =

American statistician and econometrician

- Scientific career
- Doctoral students: Wayne Fuller

Geoffrey Seddon Shepherd (1898 – 1984) was an American statistician and econometrician. He taught at Iowa State University, after earning his Ph.D. from Harvard University in 1932.
