= Rachel M. Harter =

American statistician

Rachel Margaret Harter is an American statistician and an expert in small area estimation and survey methodology. Until 2024, she worked at RTI International as a senior research statistician and as director of the Behavioral Statistics Program.

Harter grew up in Indiana, and graduated in 1979 from Wittenberg University in Ohio with a bachelor's degree in mathematics. She then went to Iowa State University for her graduate studies in statistics, earning a master's degree in 1981 and completing her Ph.D. in 1983. Her dissertation, Small area Estimation Using Nested-Error Models and Auxiliary Data, concerned small area estimation and was supervised by Wayne Fuller.

After completing her doctorate, Harter worked for the Nielsen Corporation doing survey statistics and NORC at the University of Chicago as a survey statistician and head of the statistics and methodology department. She joined RTI in 2011.

Harter has published highly cited research on using small area estimation to predict crop areas from satellite data. In 2016, the American Statistical Association recognized Harter as one of their Fellows.
