= Rongwei Fu =

Chinese-American biostatistician

- Education: Shandong Normal University; University of Connecticut
- Scientific career
- Fields: Statistics
- Workplaces: Oregon Health & Science University

Rongwei (Rochelle) F. Fu is a biostatistician who uses meta-analysis to understand disease incidence, detection, and treatment. She is a professor of biostatistics, medical informatics and clinical epidemiology at the Oregon Health & Science University (OHSU), and the director of biostatistics education at OHSU. She has also worked as lead biostatistician for the OHSU Center for Policy and Research in Emergency Medicine (CPR-EM), at the Pacific Northwest Evidence-based Practice Center (EPC), and at the OHSU Research Center for Gender-Based Medicine.

After earning a master's degree at Shandong Normal University in Jinan, China, in 1995, Fu came to the US for additional graduate study. She earned two doctorates at the University of Connecticut, one in plant science in 2000 and a second one in statistics in 2003. Her second dissertation, supervised by Dipak K. Dey, was Probabilistic Structure and Statistical Inference for Nonexplicit Population Models and Allele Frequency.

She was elected as a Fellow of the American Statistical Association in 2017.
