= National Institute of Statistical Sciences =

American institute

- Formation: 1990; 36 years ago
- Legal status: Non-profit organization
- Headquarters: Washington, D.C.
- Location: U.S.A.
- Director: David S. Matteson
- Website: www.niss.org

The National Institute of Statistical Sciences (NISS) is an American institute that researches statistical science and quantitative analysis.

== History ==
In 1985, the National Science Foundation funded a proposal by the Institute of Mathematical Statistics (IMS) to assess the status of cross-disciplinary statistical research and to make recommendations for its future. The IMS formed a panel consisted of twelve members from statistics, pure and applied mathematics, chemistry, engineering, computer science, and public affairs, including Ingram Olkin (Co-Chair), Jerome Sacks (Co-Chair), Alfred Blumstein, Amos Eddy, Bill Eddy, Peter C. Jurs, William Kruskal, Thomas Kutz, Gary C. McDonald, Ronald Peierls, Paul Shaman, and William Spurgeon. In 1990, the panel published a report on Cross-Disciplinary Research in the Statistical Sciences that led to the founding of the National Institute of Statistical Sciences.

The National Institute of Statistical Sciences was established in 1990 and located in Research Triangle Park, North Carolina by the American Statistical Association, the International Biometric Society, the Institute of Mathematical Statistics, Duke University, North Carolina State University, and the University of North Carolina at Chapel Hill and RTI International (formerly Research Triangle Institute). Dan Horvitz of RTI became the interim director. Jerome Sacks became the founding director in 1991. Alan F. Karr joined NISS as the associate director in 1992 and became the director in 2000. Nell Sedransk appointed as the associate director in 2005 and became the director in 2015. James L. Rosenberger became the director of NISS in 2017 and served until 2023. David S. Matteson became the director in 2023.

In 1993, the first NISS postdoctoral fellows joined. There are now nearly 80 of former NISS postdoctoral fellows around the world and in various organizations in each sector: academia, government, and industry. Here is a list of notable alumni:

- John Aston, Professor of Statistics at the University of Cambridge
- Adrian Dobra, Associate Professor at the University of Washington
- Shanti Gomatam, Mathematical Statistician at U.S. Food and Drug Administration
- Murali Haran, Professor and Head of Statistics at Penn State University
- Jiming Jiang, Professor of Statistics at the University of California - Davis
- Xiaodong Lin, Associate Professor at Rutgers Business School
- Matthias Schonlau, Professor of Statistics at the University of Waterloo
- Minge Xie, Professor of Statistics at Rutgers University
- Haibo Zhou, Professor of Biostatistics at the University of North Carolina

In 2000, the NISS affiliates program was created to address challenges arising in government and industry. In 2005, the NISS affiliates program was recognized by the American Statistical Association with the Statistical Partnerships among Academia, Industry, and Government (SPAIG) Award.

In 2002, the Statistical and Applied Mathematical Sciences Institute was funded by the National Science Foundation, and it was partnered with Duke University, North Carolina State University, the University of North Carolina at Chapel Hill, and the National Institute of Statistical Sciences.

From 2011 to 2018, the NISS and Duke University collaborated on the Triangle Census Research Network (TCRN), one of eight research nodes that worked on the National Census Research Network (NCRN). In 2017, the NCRN was recognized by the American Statistical Association with the Statistical Partnerships among Academia, Industry, and Government (SPAIG) Award.

== Jerome Sacks Award ==
The Jerome Sacks Award for Outstanding Cross-Disciplinary Research was created in 2001 in honor of Jerome Sacks, the founding director of NISS. The following are the winners of the award:

- 2018: G. Jogesh Babu (Penn State University)
- 2017: Jun S. Liu (Harvard University)
- 2016: William F. Eddy (Carnegie Mellon University)
- 2015: Stephen Fienberg (Carnegie Mellon University)
- 2014: Terry Speed (Walter and Eliza Hall Institute for Medical Research in Melbourne)
- 2013: Kenneth P. Burnham (Colorado State University)
- 2012: William Q. Meeker (Iowa State University)
- 2011: Emery N. Brown (Massachusetts Institute of Technology)
- 2010: Sallie A. Keller (Virginia Polytechnic Institute and State University)
- 2009: Ramanathan Gnanadesikan (retired from Bell Laboratories and Bellcore)
- 2008: John Rice (University of California, Berkeley)
- 2007: Cliff Spiegelman (Texas A&M University)
- 2006: Adrian Raftery (University of Washington)
- 2005: C.F. Jeff Wu (Georgia Institute of Technology)
- 2004: Douglas Nychka (National Center for Atmospheric Research)
- 2003: Raymond J. Carroll (Texas A&M University)
- 2002: Max Morris (Iowa State University)
- 2001: Elizabeth A. Thompson (University of Washington)

== NISS Distinguished Service Award ==
The NISS Distinguished Service Awards were established by the board of trustees in 2005 to recognize individuals who have given extraordinary service that significantly advances the mission of NISS.

- 2017: Phillip Kott (RTI International)
- 2016: Alan F. Karr (RTI International) and Robert N. Rodriguez (SAS)
- 2015: John L. Eltinge (Census Bureau) and Jamie Nunnelly (National Institute of Statistical Sciences)
- 2014: Susan S. Ellenberg (University of Pennsylvania) and Keith Soper (Merck)
- 2013: Thomas Gerig (North Carolina State University) and Sally Morton (Virginia Tech)
- 2012: Jim Landwehr (Avaya Laboratories) and Linda Young (University of Florida)
- 2011: James L. Rosenberger (Penn State University) and Jessica Utts (University of California, Irvine)
- 2010: Mary E. Bock (Purdue University), James Thomas (National Institute of Statistical Sciences), and Leland Wilkinson (H2O.ai)
- 2009: Vijay Nair (University of Michigan) and John Rolph (University of Southern California)
- 2008: Jim Berger (Duke University) and Katherine Kantner (National Institute of Statistical Sciences)
- 2007: Stephen Fienberg (Carnegie Mellon University) and Jon R. Kettenring (Drew University)
- 2006: Nancy Flournoy (University of Missouri), Ingram Olkin (Stanford University), Jerome Sacks (National Institute of Statistical Sciences), and Daniel Solomon (North Carolina State University)
- 2005: Albert H. Bowker, Daniel G. Horvitz (RTI International), Janet L. Norwood and Martha Williamson (National Institute of Statistical Sciences)

== NISS Writing Workshop for Junior Researchers ==
The Writing Workshop for Junior Researchers in Statistics and Data Science has been organized by the National Institute of Statistical Sciences from 2007 through 2016 and 2018. It has been led by Nell Sedransk and Keith Crank. It is frequently co-sponsored by the American Statistical Association, the Institute of Mathematical Statistics, the Eastern North American Region of the International Biometric Society, the Statistical Society of Canada, the International Chinese Statistical Association, the International Indian Statistical Association, the Korean International Statistics Society, and the National Science Foundation. The writing workshop provides individual hands-on guidance on how to write journal articles and funding proposals for junior researchers in statistics, biostatistics and data science.

The following are the senior mentors of NISS Writing Workshop. (Numbers indicate that the person has assisted in a previous Writing Workshop and which year(s).)

- David Banks (Duke University): 2009, 2015, 2021
- Roger Lee Berger (University of Arizona): 2007, 2008, 2010
- Keith Crank (Independent Consultant): 2007, 2008, 2009, 2010, 2011, 2012, 2013, 2014, 2015, 2016, 2018
- Marie Davidian (North Carolina State University): 2011
- Susan S. Ellenberg (University of Pennsylvania): 2008, 2011, 2012, 2013, 2015, 2018, 2019, 2020, 2022
- Xuming He (University of Michigan): 2007, 2008, 2009, 2010, 2011, 2012, 2013, 2014, 2015, 2016, 2018, 2019, 2020, 2021, 2022
- Peter Imrey (Cleveland Clinic): 2007, 2008, 2009, 2010, 2011, 2012, 2013, 2014, 2015, 2016, 2018, 2019, 2020, 2021, 2022
- Nicholas Jewell (University of California, Berkeley): 2009, 2010, 2011, 2012, 2013, 2014, 2015, 2016, 2018, 2019, 2020, 2021, 2022
- Jiming Jiang (University of California, Davis): 2011, 2015, 2021, 2022
- Karen Kafadar (University of Virginia): 2008, 2009, 2021, 2022
- Diane Lambert (Google): 2007
- Hans-Georg Mueller (University of California, Davis): 2009, 2010
- Edsel Pena (University of South Carolina): 2008, 2009, 2013, 2014, 2015, 2016
- David Rocke (University of California, Davis): 2008, 2010, 2011, 2012, 2013, 2014, 2015, 2016, 2018, 2019, 2020, 2021, 2022
- David Scott (Rice University): 2008, 2010, 2011, 2013
- Hal Stern (University of California, Irvine): 2010, 2012, 2013, 2014, 2018
- Leland Wilkinson (H2O.ai): 2007, 2008, 2009, 2010, 2011, 2012, 2014, 2016, 2018, 2019, 2020, 2021
- Heping Zhang (Yale University): 2018

The success of NISS writing workshops is partially evident in the success of workshop graduates. Many workshop graduates are serving on the editorial boards of major statistical and biostatistical journals, including Annals of Statistics, Journal of the American Statistical Association, Journal of the Royal Statistical Society, Technometrics, Journal of Computational and Graphical Statistics, Computational Statistics & Data Analysis, Journal of Multivariate Analysis, Bernoulli, Statistica Sinica, Electronic Journal of Statistics, Journal of Statistical Planning and Inference, Statistics and Its Interface, Journal of Statistical Computation and Simulation, Statistics in Medicine and Statistical Communications in Infectious Diseases.
