= World.minds =

Non-profit foundation

WORLD.MINDS
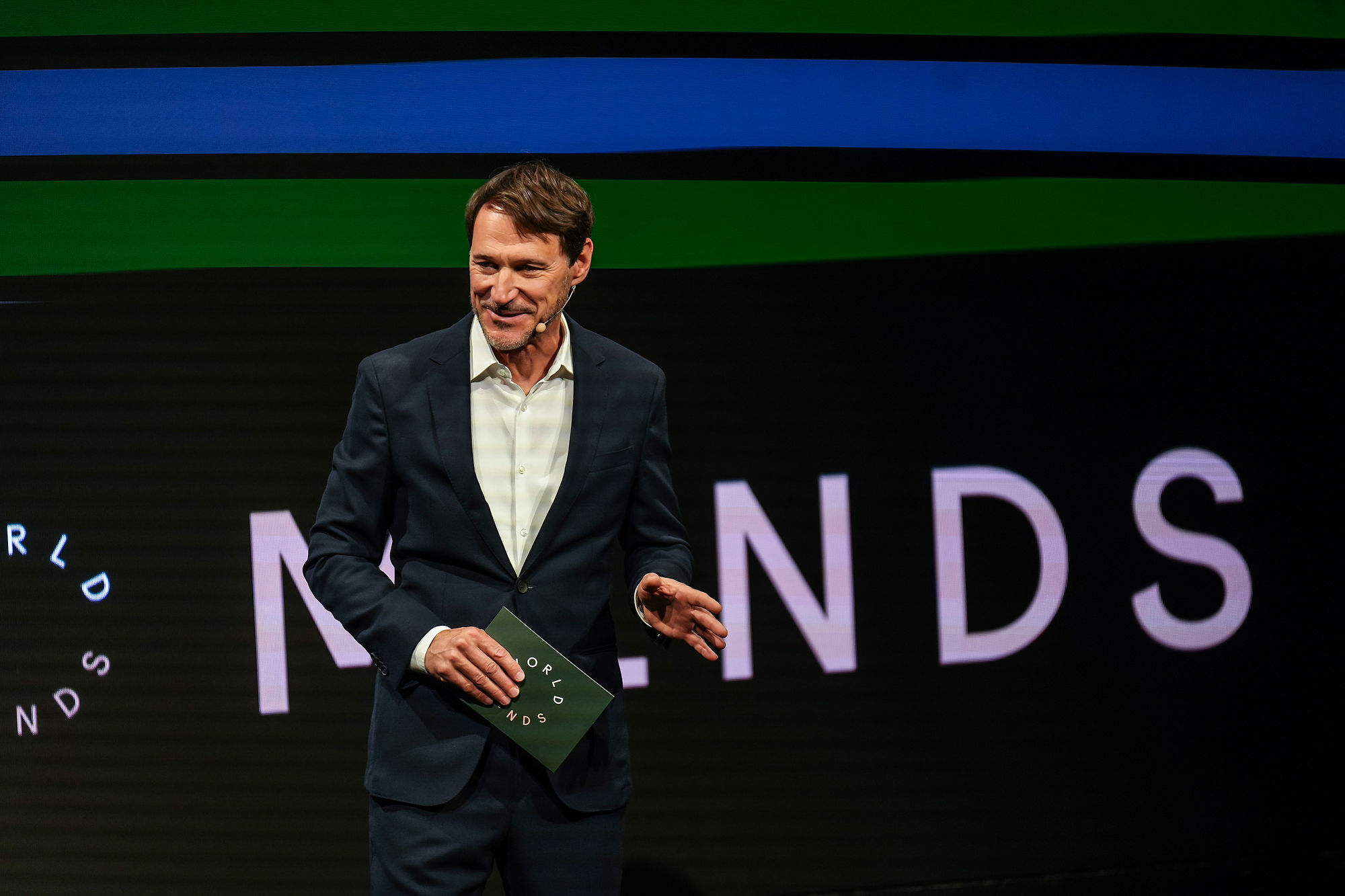
- Rolf Dobelli at a WORLD.MINDS event
- Founded: 2008; 18 years ago
- Founders: Rolf Dobelli
- Type: NGO, Think tank
- Purpose: Science, Technology, Economics, Arts
- Location: Switzerland
- Region served: Worldwide
- Method: Conferences, networking
- Key people: Rolf Dobelli (Founder)
- Website: www.worldminds.org

WORLD.MINDS (known as ZURICH.MINDS until 2016) is a nonprofit foundation set up in 2008 by Rolf Dobelli with the goal to create "a bridge between the science, business and cultural communities".

WORLD.MINDS is composed of the not-for-profit WORLD.MINDS Foundation and WORLD.MINDS Management Ltd, the operational event management company that organizes and produces all symposia and events on behalf of the WORLD.MINDS Foundation. On 29 March 2022, Axel Springer acquired a majority stake in the event management company.

The Neue Zürcher Zeitung (NZZ) called WORLD.MINDS a "community of experts for experts" and described its annual meetings as "a salon for the 21st century". The Spanish newspaper AS describes WORLD.MINDS as a "laboratory for ideas".

== Membership ==
Members of the advisory board include former Director of the Central Intelligence Agency David Petraeus, the historian Niall Ferguson, and founder of 3G Capital Jorge Paulo Lemann. In the past, former US secretary of State Henry Kissinger was also on the advisory board.

WORLD.MINDS has around 1,000 members, including Nobel prize laureate Kurt Wuthrich, activist and author Ayaan Hirsi Ali, President of the ETH Board Michael Hengartner, Airbus CTO Grazia Vittadini, philosopher John N. Gray of the London School of Economics, the rector of ETH Zurich Sarah Springman, Max Planck Institute for Human Development director Gerd Gigerenzer, writer and politician Matt Ridley, Indian artist Aparna Rao, American nuclear engineer and MIT board member Leslie Dewan, economist Paul Romer, investor and author Guy Spier, professor of bioethics at ETH Zurich and Fellow at Harvard University's Berkman Klein Center Effy Vayena, neuroeconomist Ernst Fehr, experimental psychologist Roy Baumeister, investor and entrepreneur Daniel Aegerter, Stanford University professor of mechanical engineering Allison Okamura, MIT astrophysicist Sara Seager, Harvard psychologist and happiness researcher Dan Gilbert, and French-American mathematician and polymath Benoit Mandelbrot, along with artists such as Ai Weiwei and US-Israeli architect and designer Neri Oxman.

The meetings are attended by around 400 guests each year, and WORLD.MINDS also holds regular in-depth meetings on specific issues, such as WORLD.MINDS MOBILITY in 2018, which focused on the future of mobility.

== History ==
In December 2017, former Swiss President Doris Leuthard opened the 2017 WORLD.MINDS flagship Annual Symposium event in Zurich, where the Chinese dissident artist Ai Weiwei spoke with Uli Sigg, the world's largest collector of contemporary Chinese art, about Ai's art, activism and views on the future of China.

In December 2020, former South African President and Nobel Peace Laureate F. W. de Klerk proclaimed at WORLD.MINDS that South Africa would be like Syria was then, had it not been for the policies his government put in place to end apartheid. TRT World moderator Ghida Fakhry had asked De Klerk whether, in addition to the moral principles and economic realities (sanctions) behind ending apartheid, his government's decision to end the injustice was done to protect and salvage South Africa for the white minority.

WORLD.MINDS has received some coverage on Handelszeitung. In The Daily Beast, journalist Noah Kirsch has called WORLD.MINDS a "Mini Davos" as a "Mini Davos" attended by members of the "Global Elite."
