= Wayne Fuller =

American statistician (born 1931)

Wayne A. Fuller
- Born: June 15, 1931 (age 95)
- Education: Iowa State University
- Known for: Dickey–Fuller test
- Scientific career
- Fields: Statistics, econometrics
- Workplaces: Iowa State University
- Doctoral advisor: Geoffrey Shepherd
- Doctoral students: David Dickey; Andreea Erciulescu; A. Ronald Gallant; Rachel M. Harter; Jae-Kwang Kim

Wayne Arthur Fuller (born June 15, 1931) is an American statistician who has specialised in econometrics, survey sampling and time series analysis. He was on the staff of Iowa State University from 1959, becoming a distinguished professor in 1983.

Fuller received his degrees from Iowa State University, with a B.S. in 1955, an M.S. in 1957 and a Ph.D. in agricultural economics in 1959. During his long career at Iowa State, he supervised 88 Ph.D. or M.S. dissertations.

Fuller is a fellow of the American Statistical Association, the Econometric Society, the Institute of Mathematical Statistics, and the International Statistical Institute. Fuller also served as an editor of the American Journal of Agricultural Economics, Journal of the American Statistical Association, The American Statistician, Journal of Business and Economic Statistics, and Survey Methodology. He also served on numerous National Academy of Science panels and was a member of the Committee on National Statistics. Wayne Fuller received 2003 Marvin Zelen Leadership Award in Statistical Science. He also received the 2002 Waksberg Award from the journal Survey Methodology. In 2011 Fuller was recipient of the American Statistical Association's Founders Award.

In 2009, he received an honorary doctorate from North Carolina State University. In 2011, he received an honorary doctorate from the University of Neuchâtel (Switzerland).

== Important works ==
- Dickey, D. A.; Fuller, W. A. (1979). "Distribution of the Estimators for Autoregressive Time Series with a Unit Root". Journal of the American Statistical Association. 74 (366): 427–431. doi:10.2307/2286348. JSTOR 2286348.
- Fuller, W.A. (1987) Measurement Error Models, Wiley. ISBN 0-471-86187-1
- Fuller, W.A. (1996) Introduction to Statistical Time Series, 2nd Edition, Wiley. ISBN 0-471-55239-9
- Fuller, W.A. (2009) Sampling Statistics, Wiley. ISBN 0-470-45460-1
