= Shu Yang (statistician) =

Chinese-American statistician

Shu Yang is a Chinese and American statistician whose research topics have included causal inference, survey sampling, and missing data. She is a professor of statistics at North Carolina State University.

== Education and career ==
Yang studied mathematics and applied mathematics at Beijing Normal University, receiving a bachelor's degree in 2009. She continued her studies in statistics and applied mathematics at Iowa State University, where she completed her Ph.D. in 2014. Her dissertation, Fractional imputation methods in missing data analysis and spatial statistic, was jointly advised by Jae-Kwang Kim and Zhengyuan Zhu.

Next, she became a postdoctoral researcher in biostatistics at Harvard University, working there with Judith Lok, from 2014 to 2016. She joined North Carolina State University as an assistant professor of statistics in 2016, and was tenured as an associate professor in 2021.

== Recognition ==
Yang was one of eight recipients of the 2024 Committee of Presidents of Statistical Societies Emerging Leader Awards, given "for fundamental contributions to the development of trial design and analysis using real-world data and causal inference methods for complex clinical and observational studies; for outstanding advising and mentoring; and for a pivotal role in bridging the gap between academia and the pharmaceutical and regulatory sectors". She was elected as a Fellow of the American Statistical Association in 2026.
