= Susan S. Ellenberg =

American statistician

- Education: Radcliffe College
- Scientific career
- Fields: Biostatistics; Medical ethics Health policy
- Workplaces: University of Pennsylvania

Susan S. Ellenberg is an American statistician specializing in the design of clinical trials and in the safety of medical products. She is a professor of biostatistics, medical ethics and health policy in the Perelman School of Medicine at the University of Pennsylvania. She was the 1993 president of the Society for Clinical Trials and the 1999 President of the Eastern North American Region of the International Biometric Society.

== Education and career ==
Ellenberg graduated from Radcliffe College in 1967. She earned a master's degree from the Harvard Graduate School of Education and became a high school mathematics teacher. She stopped teaching to raise a family, and began working as a computer programmer for Jerome Cornfield at George Washington University, something she could do while working from home. She became a graduate student at George Washington University, completing a Ph.D. in mathematical statistics there in 1980, while continuing to work for Cornfield.

She joined the National Cancer Institute in 1982, and in 1988 moved to the National Institute of Allergy and Infectious Diseases as chief of the newly founded Biostatistics Branch of the Division of AIDS. While attending an International AIDS Conference in Montreal, Ellenberg obtained an ACT UP Treatment Research Agenda about humanizing drug trials. She shared copies with a working group of statisticians at NIH and FDA, quickly supplemented by AIDS activists and interested clinicians, to discuss improved approaches to AIDS clinical research. For her role in AIDS research, Ellenberg was featured in the film How to Survive a Plague.

She moved again in 1993 to the Food and Drug Administration, as director of the Office of Biostatistics and Epidemiology in the Center for Biologics Evaluation and Research. She took her present position at the Perelman School in 2004.

In 2011, she became Chair of the Board of Trustees of the National Institute of Statistical Sciences. At the Perelman School, she has also served as Associate Dean for Clinical Research.

== Book ==
With Thomas Fleming and David DeMets, Ellenberg is the author of Data Monitoring Committees in Clinical Trials: A Practical Perspective, published in 2002 by Wiley.

== Recognition ==
Ellenberg became a Fellow of the American Statistical Association in 1991. She is also an elected member of the International Statistical Institute, and a fellow of the American Association for the Advancement of Science and of the Society for Clinical Trials.

She received the American Statistical Association Founders Award in 1996, the 2014 Distinguished Achievement Award from the National Institute of Statistical Sciences, and the 2018 Janet L. Norwood Award for outstanding achievement by a woman in statistical sciences.

In 2019 she was given the Florence Nightingale David Award of the Committee of Presidents of Statistical Societies and Caucus for Women in Statistics "for impactful leadership roles at the NIH, FDA and the University of Pennsylvania developing and evaluating new methodologies and specialized approaches to improve the conduct of clinical trials; for influencing ethical practice and leading development of important regulatory policies; for leadership in setting standards for clinical trial data monitoring committees; for senior statistical leadership for many multicenter clinical research network clinical trials; for distinguished leadership in numerous professional societies and national and international committees addressing major public health challenges; and for serving as an exceptional academic role model for faculty and students".

== Personal life ==
Ellenberg is married to statistician Jonas H. Ellenberg and mother of mathematician Jordan Ellenberg.
