= Jordan Ellenberg =

American mathematician (born 1971)

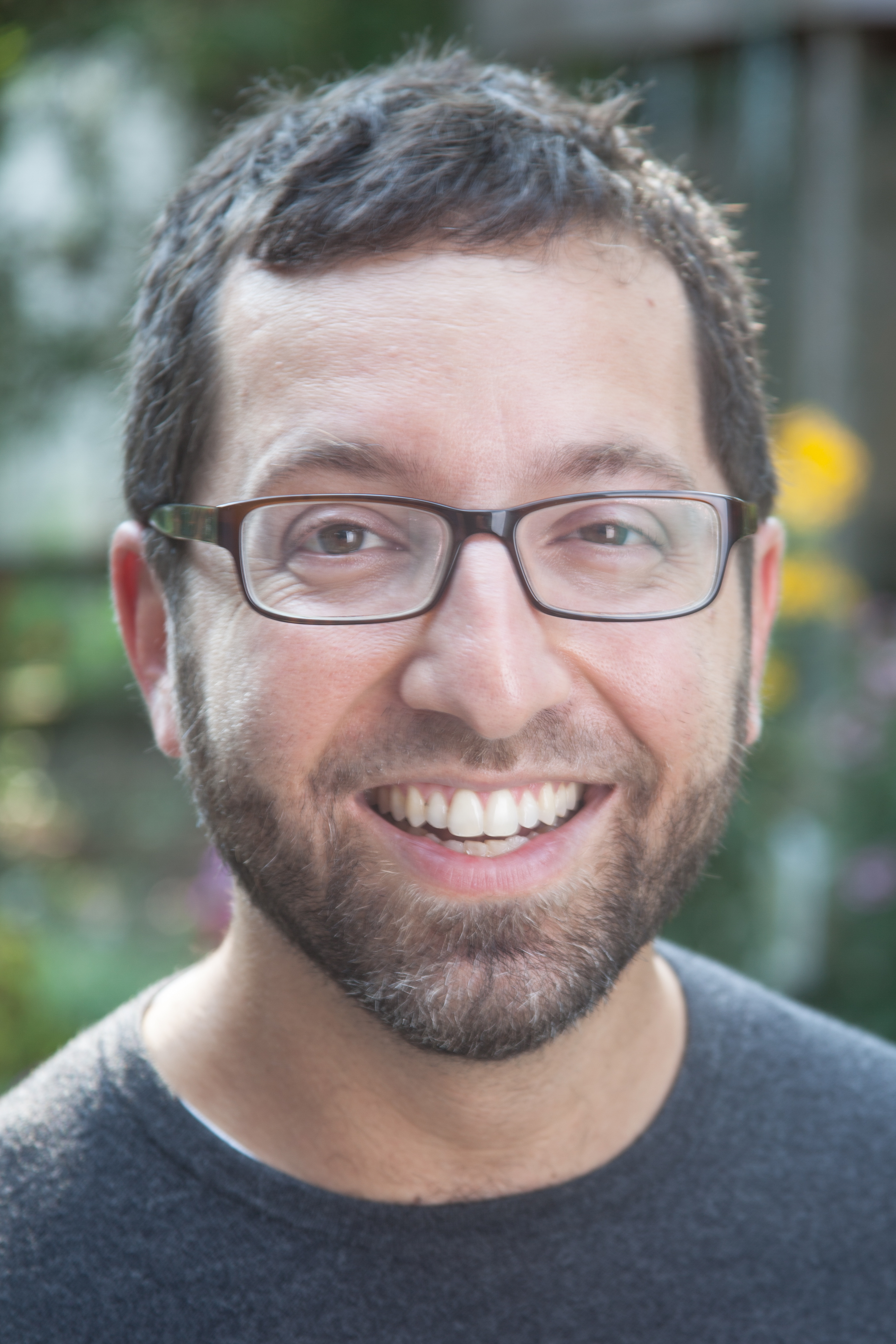
- Born: October 30, 1971 (age 54); Potomac, Maryland, U.S.
- Education: Harvard University
- Parents: Susan S. Ellenberg; Jonas H. Ellenberg
- Awards: Guggenheim Fellowship (2015)
- Scientific career
- Fields: Mathematics
- Workplaces: University of Wisconsin–Madison
- Doctoral advisor: Barry Mazur

Jordan Stuart Ellenberg (born October 30, 1971) is an American mathematician who is a professor of mathematics at the University of Wisconsin–Madison. His research involves arithmetic geometry. He is also an author of both fiction and non-fiction writing.

== Early life ==
Ellenberg was born in Potomac, Maryland. He was a child prodigy who taught himself to read at the age of two by watching Sesame Street. His mother discovered his ability one day while she was driving on the Capital Beltway when her toddler informed her, "The sign says 'Bethesda is to the right.'" In second grade, he helped his teenage babysitter with her math homework. By fourth grade, he was participating in high school competitions (such as the American Regions Mathematics League) as a member of the Montgomery County math team. And by eighth grade, he had started college-level work.

He was part of the Johns Hopkins University Study of Mathematically Precocious Youth longitudinal cohort. He scored a perfect 800 on the math portion and a 680 on the verbal portion of the SAT-I exam at the age of 12. When he was in eighth grade, he took honors calculus classes at the University of Maryland; when he was a junior at Winston Churchill High School, he earned a perfect score of 1600 on the SAT; and as a high school senior, he placed second in the national Westinghouse Science Talent Search. He participated in the International Mathematical Olympiads three times, winning gold medals in 1987 and 1989 (with perfect scores) and a silver medal in 1988. He was also a two-time Putnam fellow (1990 and 1992) while at Harvard.

== Career ==
In 2004, he began teaching at the University of Wisconsin-Madison and is currently the John D. MacArthur Professor of Mathematics, a position he has held since 2015. In 2012 he became a fellow of the American Mathematical Society and was a plenary speaker at the 2013 Joint Mathematics Meetings where he spoke on the subject of number theory and algebraic topology, the study of abstract high-dimensional shapes and the relations between them. He was named a Guggenheim Fellow in 2015. He was elected as one of the six A.D. White Professors-at-Large at Cornell in 2019. His research focuses on "the fields of number theory and algebraic geometry."

In addition to his research articles, he has authored a novel, The Grasshopper King, which was a finalist for the 2004 Young Lions Fiction Award; the "Do the Math" column in Slate; two non-fiction books, How Not to Be Wrong and Shape: The Hidden Geometry of Information, Biology, Strategy, Democracy, and Everything Else (2022); and articles on mathematical topics in many newspapers and general magazines.

Ellenberg was a mathematics consultant for the 2017 film Gifted, which features a math prodigy as its protagonist; he also made a cameo appearance in the film as a professor lecturing on the partition function and Ramanujan's congruences.

== Personal life ==
Ellenberg lives in Madison, Wisconsin, with his wife and children. He is the son of statisticians Susan S. Ellenberg and Jonas H. Ellenberg.

He maintains a blog called Quomodocumque which means "after whatever fashion" in Latin.

== Works ==
=== Nonfiction ===
- How Not to Be Wrong: The Power of Mathematical Thinking (Penguin, 2014) ISBN 978-1594205224
- Shape: The Hidden Geometry of Information, Biology, Strategy, Democracy, and Everything Else. Description and Kirkus book review. (Penguin, 2021) ISBN 9781984879059

=== Novels ===
- The Grasshopper King (Coffee House Press, 2003) ISBN 978-1566891394

=== Essays ===
- Ellenberg, Jordan (May 30, 2014). "The Wrong Way to Treat Child Geniuses". Wall Street Journal.
- Ellenberg, Jordan (July 24, 2014). "Don't Teach Math, Coach It". New York Times.
- Ellenberg, Jordan (22 May 2013). "The Beauty of Bounded Gaps". Slate Magazine.
- Ellenberg, Jordan (November 2003). "The Last Great Problem". The Believer.
- Ellenberg, Jordan (May 23, 2021). "What Honest Abe Learned from Geometry". Wall Street Journal. Ellenberg's essay is adapted from his 2021 book, Shape: The Hidden Geometry of Information, Biology, Strategy, Democracy, and Everything Else, Penguin.

=== Filmography ===
Year	Title	Role	Notes	Ref
2017	Gifted	Professor	Credited cameo	
