= Matthias Schonlau =

German statistician

Matthias Schonlau (born 9 November 1967) is a German Professor of statistics and actuarial science at the University of Waterloo.

== Early life and career ==
Matthias Schonlau was born in Höxter, Germany. He attended University of Ulm for an undergrad degree but never obtained it because he became enrolled into a master's program at the Queen's University from which he graduated in 1993. In 1997 Matthias got his Ph.D. from the University of Waterloo.

From 1997 to 1999 he was a researcher for the National Institute of Statistical Sciences under mentorship of Alan Karr and during the same time worked as a security hacker at the AT&T Labs.

From 1999 to 2011 he worked as survey methodologist for RAND Corporation under mentorship of Sally Morton at its Santa Monica headquarters and eventually moved to their Pittsburgh office. From 2009 to 2010 he attended a sabbatical at the German Institute for Economic Research which was hosted in cooperation with the Max Planck Institute for Human Development and from 2015 to 2016 he was a visiting scholar at the University of Auckland. From 2015 to 2018 he was a member of the European Survey Research Association and in the end of 2018 became the president of the survey methods section of the Statistical Society of Canada. He is also an associate editor of the Survey Research Methods.

== Recognition ==
Schonlau is an NISS Distinguished Alumni Award recipient. He was elected as a Fellow of the American Statistical Association in 2020. In 2022 he was the recipient of a Humboldt Prize.

== Personal life ==
Matthias Schonlau is married to Dr. Karla Kaphengst, a physician from the University Health and Counselling Centre. They have two children.
