= Rolf Dobelli =

Swiss writer

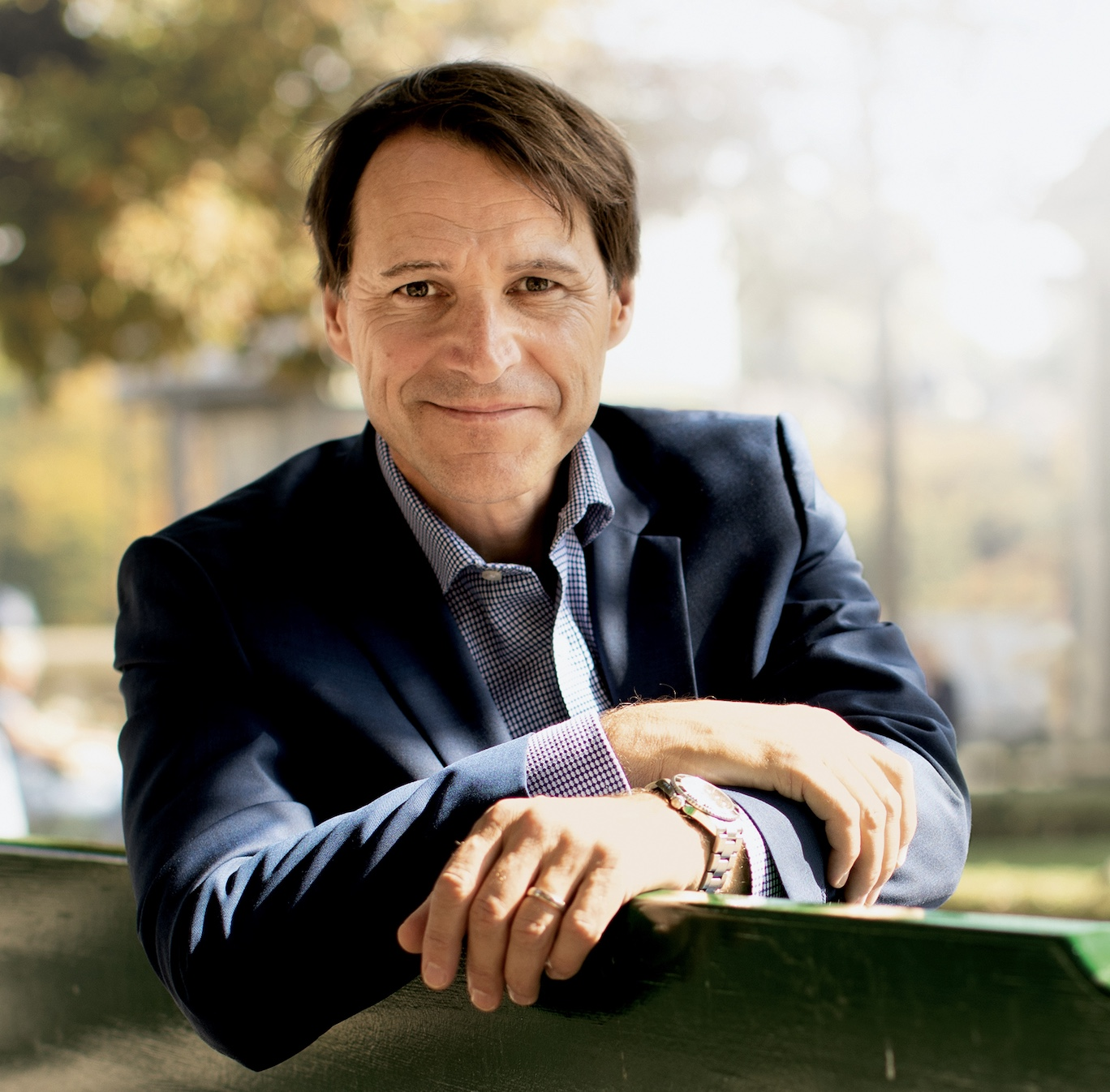
- Dobelli's promotional portrait in 2017
- Born: 15 July 1966 (age 60); Luzern, Switzerland
- Occupations: Author, businessman

Rolf Dobelli (born 15 July 1966 in Luzern, Switzerland, as Rolf Döbeli) is a Swiss author and entrepreneur. He is the founder of World.minds. He writes books on decision-making and critical thinking.

== Life ==
Dobelli studied philosophy and business administration at the University of St. Gallen where he graduated with a doctorate on the "Deconstruction of Economic Discourse" in 1995. He then went to work as the CFO and Managing Director in various Swissair subsidiaries. In 1999, he co-founded "getAbstract".

From 2001 to 2009, Dobelli hosted a weekly television show "Seitenweise Wirtschaft" for the Swiss newspaper and media company, NZZ. He also wrote a weekly column on the Art of Thinking Clearly. He regularly writes for POLITICO, where he has conducted the very last public interview with Henry Kissinger. In 2024, Dobelli was a speaker at the Munich Security Conference. At the 2006 World Economic Forum ski race, Dobelli scored second place.

Dobelli, who sees himself as a modern Stoic, founded World.minds in 2008 to create a bridge between the science, business and cultural communities. Speakers included Nassim Taleb, Gerhard Schröder, F. W. de Klerk, Matt Ridley, Henry Kissinger, Ehud Olmert, General David Petraeus, Lord Norman Foster, among others. In March 2022, media group Axel Springer took over the event management arm of World.Minds to extend its portfolio of community business.

He resigned from getAbstract in 2011 so that he could dedicate himself to writing. Dobelli's increasing dissatisfaction with the world of pure business was already reflected in his 2003 novel titled "35 - A Midlife Story". This was followed by his 2004 book, "And what do you do for a living" and his 2007 book "Who am I? 777 indiscreet questions."

== "Avoid news consumption" ==
Dobelli advises his readers to "avoid news consumption". He cites "fifteen reasons to avoid news" in a 2013 blog post. It is the subject of a book in English titled, "Stop Reading the News: How to cope with the information overload and think more clearly". Dobelli's writings are sometimes controversial. The Guardian newspaper columnist Madeleine Bunting has even gone so far as accusing his ideas on news of being "dangerous". In 2020, in a conversation with Rob Wijnberg Dobelli said, "news focuses mainly on exceptional events. It doesn't help you to fundamentally to understand the world. And it makes you cynical and anxious". In 2024, the New York Times referenced his book in an article by Ginia Bellafante about news fatigue.

== Books and reception ==
In 2003, Diogenes Verlag (Switzerland) published his first novel, Fünfunddreissig ("Thirty-five"), followed by Und was machen Sie beruflich? ("And What Do You Do for a Living?") in 2004, Himmelreich (The Heavens) in 2006, Wer bin ich? ("Who am I?") and Turbulenzen ("Turbulence") in 2007 and Massimo Marini in 2010. The major themes in Dobelli's novels are the meaning of success and the role of randomness in business and in life.

Dobelli is the author of The Art of Thinking Clearly (Die Kunst des klaren Denkens), originally published by Carl Hanser Verlag in 2011, which was an instant success, entering Germany's Der Spiegel Bestseller list as number 1. It was the bestselling non-fiction book in Germany and Switzerland in 2012. It was translated into English in 2013 by Nicky Griffin and hit the top ten bestseller lists in the U.K, South Korea, India, Ireland, Hong Kong and Singapore. In 2019 former Chief of Staff of the US Airforce Ronald Fogleman added the book to the top CSAF Required reading program. Dobelli presented his new book, "The Art of the Good Life", at a London School of Economics (LSE) Business Review event in October 2017.

In 2020 Dobelli published "Stop Reading the News, A Manifesto for a Happier, Calmer and Wiser Life". In 2012 Dobelli had already published an essay on this topic on his personal website, which The Guardian reported about in 2013. Martin Newman, reviewing the book for the Financial Review wrote, "'Stop Reading the News' explores the explosion of opinion-based news, the elevation of mediocrity over substance (The Kardashians!!), the way news creates the illusion of empathy, can elevate stress levels and builds a mindset that reinforces negativity". In November 2020, when asked how to deal with the Covid pandemic, Dobelli simply commented: "Opinions are like noses: everyone has one. Let's stop complaining."

=== Criticism ===
In 2013, Nassim Nicholas Taleb published a piece on his website in which he accused Dobelli of plagiarism. Later, Christopher Chabris also published what he claimed to be an example in Dobelli's book that is referenced but does not have quotation marks. While Dobelli never claimed that the ideas were his, he has acknowledged their concerns and has updated subsequent editions. Claims of plagiarism have been disputed by Claudius Seidl, the cultural editor of the Frankfurter Allgemeine Zeitung, who stated: "Not a single sentence suggests that Dobelli thought it all up himself; on the contrary, sometimes it's almost a little tiresome how Dobelli repeatedly refers to the academic authority of the people who gave him the insights."

== Bibliography ==
=== Books ===
==== In German ====
- Fünfunddreissig (Thirty-five), 2003
- Und was machen Sie beruflich? (And What Do You Do for a Living?), 2004
- Himmelreich (The Heavens), 2006
- Wer bin ich? (Who Am I?), 2007
- Turbulenzen (Turbulence), 2007
- Massimo Marini, 2010
- Die Kunst des klaren Denkens (The Art of Thinking Clearly), 2011
- Die Kunst des klugen Handelns (The Art of Acting Clearly), 2012
- Fragen an das Leben, 2014
- Die Kunst des guten Lebens, 2017
- Die Kunst des digitalen Lebens, 2019
- Die Not-To-Do-Liste, 2024
- Jetzt sind Sie gefragt, 2025
- Das können nur Sie beantworten, 2026

==== In English ====
- The art of thinking clearly, 2013
- The art of the good life, Sceptre, 2017
- Stop Reading the News, 2020
- The Not-To-Do List, 2025
- Success Through Less, 2025

=== Selected publications ===
- Dobelli, R. D. (2009). Conversation. In N. N. Taleb, Le Hasard Sauvage: Comment la chance nous trompe? Paris: Les Belles Lettres. Actu-Philosophia.com
- Dobelli, R. D. (2014). The Paradox of Material Progress. In J. Brockman (Ed.), What Should We Be Worried About? New York: Harper. ISBN 9780062296238.
- Dobelli, R. D. (2015). Self-Aware IA: Not In a Thousand Years. In J. Brockman (Ed.), What Do You Think About Machines That Think? New York: Harper. Edge.com.
- Dobelli, R. D. (2017). General Standardization Theory. In J. Brockman (Ed.), This Idea is Brilliant: Lost, Overlooked, and Underappreciated Scientific Concepts Everyone Should Know. New York: Harper. ISBN 978-0062698216. Edge.com.
- Dobelli, R. D. (2019). Does this Question Exist in a Parallel Universe? In J. Brockman (Ed.), The Last Unknowns: Deep, Elegant, Profound Unanswered Questions About the Universe, the Mind, the Future of Civilization, and the Meaning of Life. New York: Harper. ISBN 9780062897947

== Memberships ==
- Edge Foundation, Inc.,
- PEN International
- Royal Society of Arts

== Literature ==
- Rolf Dobelli, in the Munzinger-Archiv
- Entry about Rolf Dobelli in the encyclopedia of the Association of Swiss Authors
