= Jonas H. Ellenberg =

American statistician

Jonas Harold Ellenberg is emeritus professor of biostatistics and epidemiology in the Department of Biostatistics, Epidemiology & Informatics of the Perelman School of Medicine, University of Pennsylvania. He is a fellow of the American Statistical Association, the Society for Clinical Trials and the American Association for the Advancement of Science (AAAS).

== Education ==
Ellenberg earned his BSc (Note: Sources are divided regarding his major at Wharton. He studied either economics or statistics.) from the Wharton School at the University of Pennsylvania in 1963 and his AM and PhD (both in mathematical statistics) from Harvard University in 1964 and 1970, respectively. His PhD thesis, Detection of Outliers in Multivariate Linear Regression, was written under the tutelage of W. G. Cochran.

== Career ==
After completion of his PhD, Ellenberg joined the National Institute for Neurological Diseases and Blindness (now known as the National Institute for Neurological Diseases and Stroke [NINDS]) at the National Institutes of Health, where he studied the causes of neurologic disorders in children, including cerebral palsy (CP) and febrile seizure from the Collaborative Perinatal Project. Results from this large longitudinal study showed for the first time that CP was partially caused by factors occurring before labor and delivery. Ellenberg's collaboration with medical researchers also demonstrated that use of phenobarbital did not prevent repeat febrile seizures in infants. Ellenberg stayed at NINDS for 26 years, including 11 years as head of the biometrics department.

After leaving NIH, Ellenberg joined Westat as vice president and head of biostatistics, where he remained for 10 years.

In 2004, Ellenberg became professor of biostatistics and associate dean of the school of medicine at the University of Pennsylvania.

== Recognition ==
Ellenberg was elected as a fellow of the ASA in 1982, the Society for Clinical Trials in 2014, and the AAAS in 1994. He was an elected member of the International Statistical Institute. In 1988, he served as president of the International Biometric Society, and in 1999 became the president of the ASA.

== Personal life ==
Ellenberg is the husband of statistician Susan S. Ellenberg and father of mathematician Jordan Ellenberg

== Selected publications ==
=== Statistical ethics ===
- Ellenberg, Jonas H. (1983). "Ethical Guidelines for Statistical Practice: A Historical Perspective". The American Statistician. 37 (1): 1–4. doi:10.1080/00031305.1983.10483062. ISSN 0003-1305.

=== Clinical study design and analysis ===
- Ellenberg, Jonas H. (1973). "The Joint Distribution of the Standardized Least Squares Residuals from a General Linear Regression". Journal of the American Statistical Association. 68 (344): 941–943. doi:10.2307/2284526. JSTOR 2284526.
- Byar, David P.; Simon, Richard M.; Friedewald, William T.; Schlesselman, James J.; Demets, David L.; Ellenberg, Jonas H.; Gail, Mitchell H.; Ware, James H. (1976). "Randomized Clinical Trials". New England Journal of Medicine. 295 (2): 74–80. doi:10.1056/NEJM197607082950204.
- Ellenberg, Jonas H. (1976). "Testing for a Single Outlier from a General Linear Regression". Biometrics. 32 (3): 637–645. doi:10.2307/2529752. JSTOR 2529752. PMID 963176.
- Byar, David P.; Simon, Richard M.; Friedewald, William T.; Schlesselman, James J.; Demets, David L.; Ellenberg, Jonas H.; Gail, Mitchell H.; Ware, James H. (1976). "Randomized Clinical Trials". New England Journal of Medicine. 295 (2): 74–80. doi:10.1056/NEJM197607082950204. PMID 775331.
- Ellenberg, Jonas H. (1980). "Sample Selection and the Natural History of Disease". JAMA. 243 (13): 1337. doi:10.1001/jama.1980.03300390021015.
- Dambrosia, James M.; Ellenberg, Jonas H. (1980). "Statistical Considerations for a Medical Data Base". Biometrics. 36 (2): 323–332. doi:10.2307/2529987. JSTOR 2529987. PMID 6996752.
- Ellenberg, Jonas H.; Armitage, Peter; Chalmers, Thomas C.; Gehan, Edmund A.; O'Fallon, Judith R.; Pocock, Stuart J.; Zelen, Marvin (1990). "Biostatistical Collaboration in Medical Research". Biometrics. 46 (1): 1–32. doi:10.2307/2531627. JSTOR 2531627. PMID 2190637.
- Lee, Young Jack; Ellenberg, Jonas H.; Hirtz, Deborah G.; Nelson, Karin B. (1991). "Analysis of clinical trials by treatment actually received: Is it really an option?". Statistics in Medicine. 10 (10): 1595–1605. doi:10.1002/sim.4780101011. PMID 1947515.
- Ellenberg, Jonas H. (1994). "Selection bias in observational and experimental studies". Statistics in Medicine. 13 (5–7): 557–567. doi:10.1002/sim.4780130518. PMID 8023035.
- Ellenberg, Jonas H. (1996). "Intent-to-Treat Analysis versus As-Treated Analysis". Drug Information Journal. 30 (2): 535–544. doi:10.1177/009286159603000229.

=== Neonatal health ===
- Nelson, Karin B.; Ellenberg, Jonas H. (1976). "Predictors of Epilepsy in Children Who Have Experienced Febrile Seizures". New England Journal of Medicine. 295 (19): 1029–1033. doi:10.1056/NEJM197611042951901. PMID 972656.
- Nelson, Karin B.; Ellenberg, Jonas H. (1978). "Prognosis in Children with Febrile Seizures". Pediatrics. 61 (5): 720–727. doi:10.1542/peds.61.5.720. PMID 662510.
- Nelson, Karin B.; Ellenberg, Jonas H. (1979). "Neonatal Signs as Predictors of Cerebral Palsy". Pediatrics. 64 (2): 225–232. doi:10.1542/peds.64.2.225. PMID 471612.
- Ellenberg, Jonas H.; Hirtz, Deborah G.; Nelson, Karin B. (1984). "Age at onset of seizures in young children". Annals of Neurology. 15 (2): 127–134. doi:10.1002/ana.410150204. PMID 6703653.
- Nelson, Karin B.; Ellenberg, Jonas H. (1986). "Antecedents of Cerebral Palsy". New England Journal of Medicine. 315 (2): 81–86. doi:10.1056/NEJM198607103150202. PMID 3724803.
- Farwell, Jacqueline R.; Lee, Young Jack; Hirtz, Deborah G.; Sulzbacher, Stephen I.; Ellenberg, Jonas H.; Nelson, Karin B. (1990). "Phenobarbital for Febrile Seizures — Effects on Intelligence and on Seizure Recurrence". New England Journal of Medicine. 322 (6): 364–369. doi:10.1056/NEJM199002083220604. PMID 2242106.
- Hirtz, Deborah G.; Chen, Ta Chuan; Nelson, Karin B.; Sulzbacher, Stephen; Farwell, Jacqueline R.; Ellenberg, Jonas H. (1993). "Does phenobarbital used for febrile seizures cause sleep disturbances?". Pediatric Neurology. 9 (2): 94–100. doi:10.1016/0887-8994(93)90042-B. PMID 8499051.
- Offringa, Martin; Bossuyt, Patrick M.M.; Lubsen, Jacobus; Ellenberg, Jonas H.; Nelson, Karin B.; Knudsen, Finn U.; Annegers, John F.; El-Radhi, Abdul Sahib M.; Habbema, J. Dik F.; Derksen-Lubsen, Gerarda; Hauser, W. Allen; Kurland, Leonard T.; Banajeh, Salem M.A.; Larsen, Svend (1994). "Risk factors for seizure recurrence in children with febrile seizures: A pooled analysis of individual patient data from five studies". The Journal of Pediatrics. 124 (4): 574–584. doi:10.1016/s0022-3476(05)83136-1. PMID 8151472.
- Ellenberg, Jonas H.; Nelson, Karin B. (2013). "The association of cerebral palsy with birth asphyxia: A definitional quagmire". Developmental Medicine & Child Neurology. 55 (3): 210–216. doi:10.1111/dmcn.12016. PMID 23121164.
