= Horace Secrist =

American economist

Horace Secrist (October 9, 1881 – March 5, 1943) was an American statistician and economist, a professor and the director of the Bureau of Economic Research at Northwestern University.

== Life and career ==
Secrist was born in Farmington, Utah, and received his education at Brigham Young College, Brigham Young University, and the University of Wisconsin, where he earned a bachelor's degree in economics in 1907 and a PhD in 1911 with a dissertation titled "An Economic Analysis of the Constitutional Restrictions Upon Public Indebtedness in the United States".

He began his teaching career at Brigham Young University, and later was an instructor at the University of Wisconsin. In 1918 he joined Northwestern University, where he spent most of his career, becoming a professor of economics and statistics and director of the Bureau of Economic Research. He held various positions for the federal government: as Commissioner on Industrial Relations in 1914, statistician for the Shipping Board in 1918, and supervising statistician of the Railway Labor Board in 1920–1921.

In 1918 he became a Fellow of the American Statistical Association.

== Private life and death ==
Secrist married May Alexander in 1904; they had two sons. He died at 61 following an operation in Evanston, Illinois, from the effects of a long-term disability.

== Publications ==
Secrist published thirteen textbooks in statistics and economics. In several of his publications on economics, particularly in The Triumph of Mediocrity in Business (1933), the result of a decade's investigation by Secrist and his assistants of 49 department stores and of businesses in 73 other fields, he argued that over time, competitive forces under free enterprise cause the success of better-run businesses to decline and that of weaker businesses to increase, leading to an inevitable predominance of mediocrity in American business; Secrist recommended governmental protection of the better businesses to offset this effect. Mathematical statistician Harold Hotelling pointed out in a review, and in a subsequent rebuttal of Secrist's response, that this argument constituted a misunderstanding of regression to the mean, which ensured the observed effect given the method of grouping of the observed results that Secrist had used. Secrist stated in his preface that in addition to exhaustive testing of his results on different areas of business, he had asked 38 American and European statisticians and economists to review them. The book has since been frequently used as a bad example in publications on statistics.

=== Selected publications ===
- An Introduction to Statistical Methods – 1917, revised ed. 1925
- Statistics in Business: Their Analysis, Charting and Use. McGraw-Hill. 1920.
- Readings and Problems in Statistical Methods – 1920
- Costs, Merchandising Practices, Advertising and Sales in the Retail Distribution of Clothing – 1921, with The National Association of Retail Clothiers
- Expenses, Profits and Losses in Retail Meat Stores: How Much and Why – 1924
- The Widening Retail Market and Consumers' Buying Habits – 1926
- Margins, Expenses and Profits in Retail Hardware Stores – 1928, with J. A. Folse
- Banking Standards under the Federal Reserve System – 1928
- Banking Ratios: A Study of the Operating Results of Member Banks with Special Reference to the Twelfth Federal Reserve District and to California – 1930, with Keith Powlison
- The Triumph of Mediocrity in Business – 1933
- National Bank Failures and Non-Failures: An Autopsy and Diagnosis – 1938
