= The Art of Thinking Clearly =

2013 book by Rolf Dobelli

- Author: Rolf Dobelli
- Language: English
- Subject: Decision making
- Genre: Non-fiction
- Publisher: Sceptre (UK), Farrar, Straus and Giroux (US)
- Publication date: 2013
- Publication place: United Kingdom, United States
- Media type: Print (Hardcover, ebook, Paperback, Bookapp)
- Pages: 326 pages
- ISBN: 978-1-4447-5954-9 (UK), 978-0-06-221968-8 (US)

The Art of Thinking Clearly is a 2013 book by the Swiss writer Rolf Dobelli which describes in short chapters 99 of the most common thinking errors – ranging from cognitive biases to envy and social distortions.

The book was written as weekly columns in leading newspapers in Germany, the Netherlands, and Switzerland, and later in two German books. The book was in the top ten of Germany's Der Spiegel Bestseller list for 80 consecutive weeks and has been translated into many languages. Outside Germany and Switzerland, the book hit the top ten bestseller lists in the U.K, South Korea, India, Ireland, Singapore, and Iran. The book has sold more than three million copies and has been translated in over 50 languages. Author Nassim Taleb has asserted that the book included sections plagiarised from Taleb's manuscript of Antifragile.

== See also ==
- Fallacy – Argument that uses faulty reasoning
- List of cognitive biases
- The Demon-Haunted World – 1995 book by Carl Sagan
