= Statistical and Applied Mathematical Sciences Institute =

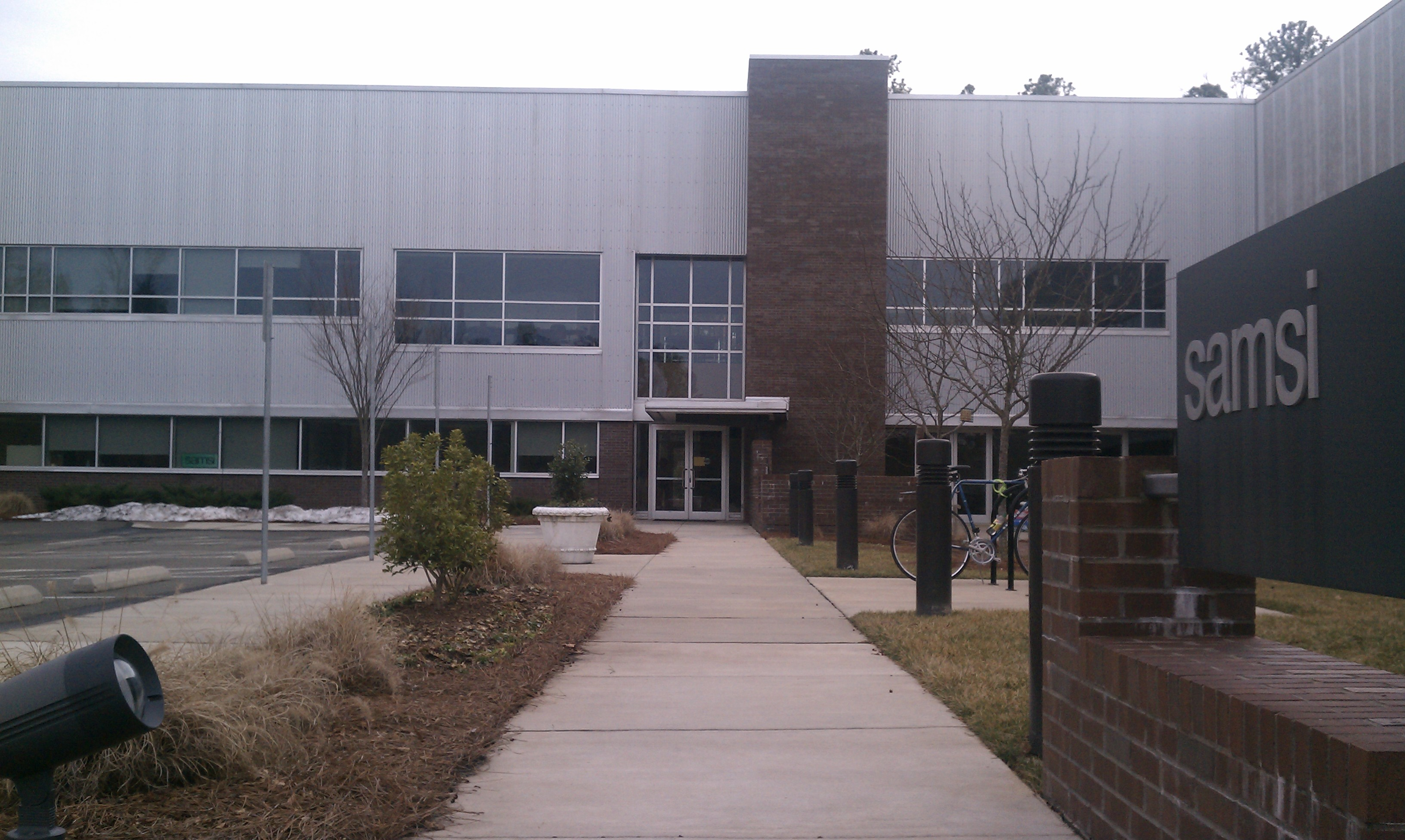
- SAMSI in 2014
- Abbreviation: SAMSI
- Formation: 2002
- Dissolved: 2021
- Location: Research Triangle Park, North Carolina
- Director: David Banks
- Website: www.samsi.info

Statistical and Applied Mathematical Sciences Institute (SAMSI) was an applied mathematics and statistics research organization based in Research Triangle Park, North Carolina. It was funded by the National Science Foundation, and partnered with Duke University, North Carolina State University, the University of North Carolina at Chapel Hill, and the National Institute of Statistical Sciences.

SAMSI was founded in 2002. In 2012, the National Science Foundation renewed SAMSI's funding for an additional five years. SAMSI offered programs in bioinformatics and statistical ecology in 2014–15. SAMSI closed its doors in August 2021, after 19 years of work.
