= Journal of Statistical Planning and Inference =

- Discipline: Statistics
- Language: English
- Edited by: A. DasGupta, H. Dette, W.-L. Loh

Publication details
- History: 1977–present
- Publisher: Elsevier
- Frequency: Monthly
- Impact factor: 0.713 (2012)

Standard abbreviations
- ISO 4: J. Stat. Plan. Inference
- MathSciNet: J. Statist. Plann. Inference

Indexing
- ISSN: 0378-3758

Links
- Journal homepage; Online access

The Journal of Statistical Planning and Inference is a monthly peer-reviewed scientific journal covering research on statistical inference. The editors-in-chief are A. DasGupta, H. Dette and W.-L. Loh. The journal was established in 1977. According to the Journal Citation Reports, the journal has a 2012 impact factor of 0.713.
