= Crossover study =

Research study in medicine

In medicine, a crossover study or crossover trial is a longitudinal study in which subjects receive a sequence of different treatments (or exposures). While crossover studies can be observational studies, many important crossover studies are controlled experiments, which are discussed in this article. Crossover designs are common for experiments in many scientific disciplines, for example psychology, pharmaceutical science, and medicine.

Randomized, controlled crossover experiments are especially important in health care. In a randomized clinical trial, the subjects are randomly assigned to different arms of the study which receive different treatments. When the trial has a repeated measures design, the same measures are collected multiple times for each subject. A crossover trial has a repeated measures design in which each patient is assigned to a sequence of two or more treatments, of which one may be a standard treatment or a placebo.

Nearly all crossover are designed to have "balance", whereby all subjects receive the same number of treatments and participate for the same number of periods. In most crossover trials each subject receives all treatments, in a random order.

Statisticians suggest that designs should have four periods, which is more efficient than the two-period design, even if the study must be truncated to three periods. However, the two-period design is often taught in non-statistical textbooks, partly because of its simplicity.

== Analysis ==
The data is analyzed using the statistical method that was specified in the clinical trial protocol, which must have been approved by the appropriate institutional review boards and regulatory agencies before the trial can begin. Most clinical trials are analyzed using repeated-measurements ANOVA (analysis of variance) or mixed models that include random effects.

In most longitudinal studies of human subjects, patients may withdraw from the trial or become "lost to follow-up". There are statistical methods for dealing with such missing-data and "censoring" problems. An important method analyzes the data according to the principle of the intention to treat.

== Advantages ==
A crossover study has two advantages over both a parallel study and a non-crossover longitudinal study. First, the influence of confounding covariates is reduced because each crossover patient serves as their own control. In a randomized non-crossover study it is often the case that different treatment-groups are found to be unbalanced on some covariates. In a controlled, randomized crossover designs, such imbalances are implausible (unless covariates were to change systematically during the study).

Second, optimal crossover designs are statistically efficient, and so require fewer subjects than do non-crossover designs (even other repeated measures designs).

Optimal crossover designs are discussed in the graduate textbook by Jones and Kenward and in the review article by Stufken. Crossover designs are discussed along with more general repeated-measurements designs in the graduate textbook by Vonesh and Chinchilli.

== Limitations and disadvantages ==
These studies are often done to improve the symptoms of patients with chronic conditions. For curative treatments or rapidly changing conditions, cross-over trials may be infeasible or unethical.

Crossover studies often have two problems:

First is the issue of "order" effects, because it is possible that the order in which treatments are administered may affect the outcome. An example might be a drug with many adverse effects given first, making patients taking a second, less harmful medicine, more sensitive to any adverse effect.

Second is the issue of "carry-over" between treatments, which confounds the estimates of the treatment effects. In practice, "carry-over" effects can be avoided with a sufficiently long "wash-out" period between treatments. However, planning for sufficiently long wash-out periods requires expert knowledge of the dynamics of the treatment, which is often unknown.

== See also ==
- Design of experiments
- Glossary of experimental design
- Randomized controlled trial
- Survival analysis
- N of 1 trial
- Single-subject design
