= Carryover =

Carryover may refer to:

- Carryover effect, in automated analyzer
- Carryover basis, in taxation
- Carryover cooking
- Carryover with steam, in power generation
- Carry-over, in advertising
