= Michael Schemper =

Biostatistician and academic

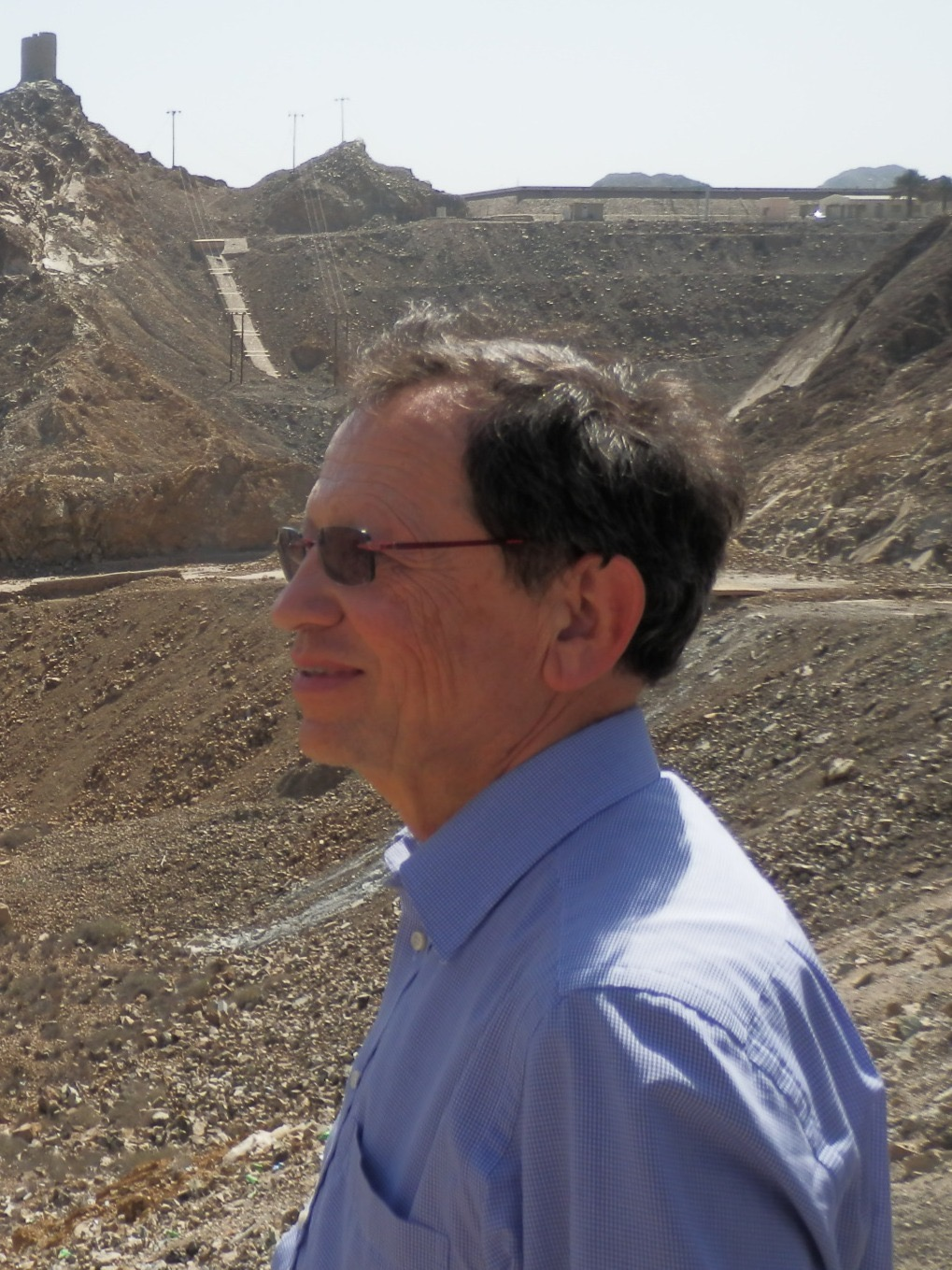
- Occupations: Biostatistician and academic

Academic background
- Education: M.Sc., Statistics; Ph.D., Statistics
- Alma mater: Vienna University

Academic work
- Institutions: Medical University of Vienna

Michael Schemper is a biostatistician and an academic, serving as professor emeritus at the Medical University of Vienna.

Schemper's research focuses on nonparametric estimation and testing methods, survival analysis, and particularly Cox regression models, logistic regression models, and explained variation in statistical models. He has been awarded Lifetime Honorary Memberships by both the International Society for Clinical Biostatistics (ISCB) and the Austro-Swiss Region (ROeS) of the International Biometric Society (IBS). According to Google Scholar, his work has been cited more than 21,000 times.

== Education ==
Schemper studied statistics at the Vienna University from 1972 to 1977, earning an M.Sc. degree in 1976 and a Ph.D. in 1977. He later completed his Habilitation in Medical Statistics and Documentation at Vienna University in 1985.

== Career ==
Schemper's academic career started as a biostatistician in 1977 and as an associate professor from 1985 at the (former) Medical Faculty of Vienna University. He was a visiting associate professor at the University of Texas in Houston, where he remained from 1987 to 1988. In 1991, he became a professor of clinical biostatistics at the Medical University of Vienna, and later became an emeritus professor there. In 1991, he founded the Institute of Clinical Biometrics at the Medical University of Vienna and remained its head until 2015.

== Research ==
Schemper has authored more than 300 publications, which have collectively received over 21,000 citations. His work spans both the application of statistics in medical research and the development of biostatistical methods. His research has focused on quantifying the variation in outcomes explained by prognostic factors, contributing conceptually to understanding the degrees of necessity and sufficiency of such factors in outcome modeling. His methodological work has addressed the analysis of survival data under non-proportional hazards and the development of solutions to the monotone likelihood problem in risk (Cox) regression. He has also examined residuals in survival analysis and the quantification of follow-up in studies of failure time. In addition, his work includes the development of statistical methods for assessing the correlation between bivariate failure times under censoring, as well as contributions to the treatment of missing data in regression analysis and to nonparametric estimation and testing in survival analysis.

== Awards and honors ==
- 2016 – Honorary lifetime membership, International Society for Clinical Biostatistics
- 2023 – Honorary lifetime membership, Austro-Swiss Region of the International Biometric Society (ROeS)

== Selected articles ==
- Mittlböck, Martina; Schemper, Michael (1996). "Explained Variation for Logistic Regression". Statistics in Medicine. 15 (19): 1987–1997. doi:10.1002/(SICI)1097-0258(19961015)15:19<1987::AID-SIM318>3.0.CO;2-9. ISSN 1097-0258.
- Schemper, Michael; Smith, Terry L. (1996). "A note on quantifying follow-up in studies of failure time". Controlled Clinical Trials. 17 (4): 343–346. doi:10.1016/0197-2456(96)00075-X. ISSN 0197-2456. PMID 8889347.
- Schemper, Michael; Heinze, Georg (1997). "Probability Imputation Revisited for Prognostic Factor Studies". Statistics in Medicine. 16 (1): 73–80. doi:10.1002/(SICI)1097-0258(19970115)16:1<73::AID-SIM472>3.0.CO;2-Z. ISSN 1097-0258.
- Schemper, Michael; Henderson, Robin (2000). "Predictive Accuracy and Explained Variation in Cox Regression". Biometrics. 56 (1): 249-255. doi:10.1111/j.0006-341X.2000.00249.x.
- Heinze, Georg; Schemper, Michael (2002). "A solution to the problem of separation in logistic regression". Statistics in Medicine. 21 (16): 2409–2419. doi:10.1002/sim.1047. ISSN 1097-0258. PMID 12210625.
- Heinze, Georg; Gnant, Michael; Schemper, Michael (2003). "Exact log-rank tests for unequal follow-up". Biometrics. 59 (4): 1151–1157. doi:10.1111/j.0006-341x.2003.00132.x. ISSN 0006-341X.
- Schemper, Michael (2003). "Predictive accuracy and explained variation". Statistics in Medicine. 22 (14): 2299–2308. doi:10.1002/sim.1486. ISSN 1097-0258.
- Wakounig, Samo; Heinze, Georg; Schemper, Michael (2015). "Non-parametric estimation of relative risk in survival and associated tests". Statistical Methods in Medical Research. 24 (6): 856–870. doi:10.1177/0962280211431022. ISSN 0962-2802.
- Gleiss, Andreas; Schemper, Michael (2019). "Quantifying degrees of necessity and of sufficiency in cause-effect relationships with dichotomous and survival outcomes". Statistics in Medicine. 38 (23): 4733–4748. doi:10.1002/sim.8331. ISSN 1097-0258. PMC 6771968. PMID 31386230.
- Gleiss, Andreas; Henderson, Robin; Schemper, Michael (2021). "Degrees of necessity and of sufficiency: Further results and extensions, with an application to covid-19 mortality in Austria". Statistics in Medicine. 40 (14): 3352–3366. doi:10.1002/sim.8961. ISSN 1097-0258. PMC 8207017. PMID 33942333.
