= Celacade =

Celacade was a non-drug, device-based treatment also known as Immune Modulation Therapy (IMT), developed by the Canadian-based biotherapeutics company Vasogen, Inc. for chronic heart failure and peripheral artery disease. Blood was piped through the device, where it was exposed to heat, ultraviolet light, and ozone, in the hope that this oxidative stress would trigger an anti-inflammatory immunomodulation response.

Despite some promising early results and one positive result in subgroup analysis, the technique usually did not produce the hoped-for clinically significant results.

== Research history ==
At the World Congress of Cardiology in September 2006 the Advanced Chronic Heart Failure Clinical Assessment of Immune Modulation Therapy (ACCLAIM) a phase III randomized, double-blind, placebo-controlled clinical trial involving some 2408 patients in 7 countries with left ventricular ejection fraction of 30% or less, reported that only one subgroup – patients with a previous cardiovascular event – benefited from the treatment. These people were 39% less likely to die or be hospitalized due to a heart attack or stroke and tended to have improved quality of life.

== Marketing approval ==
Vasogen in collaboration with Grupo Ferrer Internacional has regulatory approval to market Celacade as a medical device for the treatment of chronic heart failure in the European Union and Latin America.
