= Parallel study =

Research model

A parallel study is a type of clinical study where two groups of treatments, A and B, are given so that one group receives only A while another group receives only B. Other names for this type of study include "between patient" and "non-crossover". This is unlike a crossover study where at first one group receives treatment A and later followed by treatment B while the other group receives treatment B followed by treatment A. There are, however, certain characteristics that allow for differentiation between these two types of trials. For example, a parallel study would be more appropriate if any concerns about carryover effects were present. This type of study might also be more beneficial if the disease or disorder being studied has a likely chance of progression during the time in which the study takes place. One significant issue with parallel studies, though, is the concept of intra subject variability, which is defined as variability in response occurring within the same patient.

The two treatment groups in a parallel study can either consist of two completely separate treatments (i.e. different drugs), or simply different doses of a common drug. One major aspect of a parallel study is randomization – this ensures that the results are accurate and have a lower risk of being biased. Control groups utilizing a placebo, or active control, are often used in this type of study.
