= Pipeline planning =

Pipeline planning is a social audit that incorporates stepped wedge cluster randomised controlled trials. From a listing of districts/communities as a sampling frame, individual entities (communities, towns, districts) are randomly assigned to waves of intervention. Measurement of the impact takes advantage of the delay occasioned by the reality that there are insufficient resources to implement everywhere at the same time. The impact in the first wave contrasts with the second wave, which in turn contrasts with a third wave, and so on until all have received the intervention. Provided care is taken to achieve reasonable balance in the random allocation of communities, towns or districts to the waves, the resulting analysis can be straightforward.

Use of high level epidemiology methods into roll out of new programs has multiple advantages, including improving the program in the pipeline, but it requires a quantum shift in skills and sensibilities. In the short and middle term, third party NGOs and universities can provide some of this. Sustainability depends on government buy in – which, in turn, depends on the system showing its value in terms of money saved and impact achieved. Strong and sustained government interest is typically least present in situations that would most benefit from evidence-based planning.
