= Multicenter trial =

A multicenter research trial is a clinical trial that involves more than one independent medical institutions in enrolling and following trial participants. In multicenter trials the participant institutions follow a common treatment protocol and follow the same data collection guidelines, and there is a single coordinating center that receives, processes and analyzes study data.

== Benefits ==
An important benefit of multicenter trials is that they permit the enrollment of a larger number of participants at a faster rate, in comparison to a single-center trial, putting to use the sources of multiple institutions. This is crucial when the anticipated benefit from a treatment will be relatively small, or an expected outcome is likely to be uncommon, making a larger sample size necessary. Therefore, studies on preventive measures and therapies tend to be designed as multicenter trials. In studying novel pharmaceuticals, Phase III trials, which compare the new treatment to an established one, are usually multicenter ones. In contrast, Phase I trials, which test potential toxicity of the treatment, and Phase II trials, which establish some preliminary efficacy of the tested treatment, are usually single-center trials, as they require fewer participants.

The benefits of multicenter trials also include the potential for a more heterogenous sample of participants, from different geographic locations and a wider range of population groups, treated from physicians of different backgrounds, and the ability to compare results among centers, all of which increase the generalizability of the study. In many cases, efficacy will vary significantly between population groups with different genetic, environmental, and ethnic or cultural backgrounds ("demographic" factors); multicenter trials are better at evaluating these factors, by giving the opportunity for more subgroup analyses. Heterogeneity in the sample means that the findings will be more generalizable. On the other hand, a more heterogeneous study population generally requires a larger sample size to detect a given difference.
