= Minimisation (clinical trials) =

Minimisation is a method of adaptive stratified sampling that is used in clinical trials, as described by Pocock and Simon.

The aim of minimisation is to minimise the imbalance between the number of patients in each treatment group over a number of factors. Normally patients would be allocated to a treatment group randomly and while this maintains a good overall balance, it can lead to imbalances within sub-groups. For example, if a majority of the patients who were receiving the active drug happened to be male, or smokers, the statistical usefulness of the study would be reduced.

The traditional method to avoid this problem, known as blocked randomisation, is to stratify patients according to a number of factors (e.g. male and female, or smokers and non-smokers) and to use a separate randomisation list for each group. Each randomisation list would be created such that after every block of x patients, there would be an equal number in each treatment group. The problem with this method is that the number of lists increases exponentially with the number of stratification factors.

Minimisation addresses this problem by calculating the imbalance within each factor should the patient be allocated to a particular treatment group. The various imbalances are added together to give the overall imbalance in the study. The treatment group that would minimise the imbalance can be chosen directly, or a random element may be added (perhaps allocating a higher chance to the groups that will minimise the imbalance, or perhaps only allocating a chance to groups that will minimise the imbalance).

The imbalances can be weighted if necessary to give some factors more importance than others. Similarly a ratio can be applied to the number of patients in each treatment group.

In use, minimisation often maintains a better balance than traditional blocked randomisation, and its advantage rapidly increases with the number of stratification factors.
