= Carryover effect =

Unwanted effect in clinical chemistry

The carryover effect is a term used in clinical chemistry to describe the transfer of unwanted material from one container or mixture to another. It describes the influence of one sample upon the following one. It may be from a specimen, or a reagent, or even the washing medium. The significance of carry over is that even a small amount can lead to erroneous results.

== Carryover effect in clinical laboratory ==
Carryover experiments are widely used for clinical chemistry and immunochemistry analyzers to evaluate and validate carryover effects. The pipetting and washing systems in an automated analyzer are designed to continuously cycle between the aspiration of patient specimens and cleaning. An obvious concern is a potential for carryover of analyte from one patient specimen into one or more following patient specimens, which can falsely increase or decrease the measured analyte concentration. Specimen carryover is typically addressed by judicious choice of probe material, probe design, and an efficient probe washing system to flush the probe of residual patient specimens or reagents retained in their bores or clinging to the probe exterior surface before they are introduced into the next patient sample, reagent container, or cuvette/reaction vessel.

== Significance in carryover assessment ==
The pathological range of measurement could be of several order to reference interval(e.g., Sex hormone, Tumor marker, Troponin...etc.). A small portion of carryover could lead to erroneous results.

== Carryover assessment ==
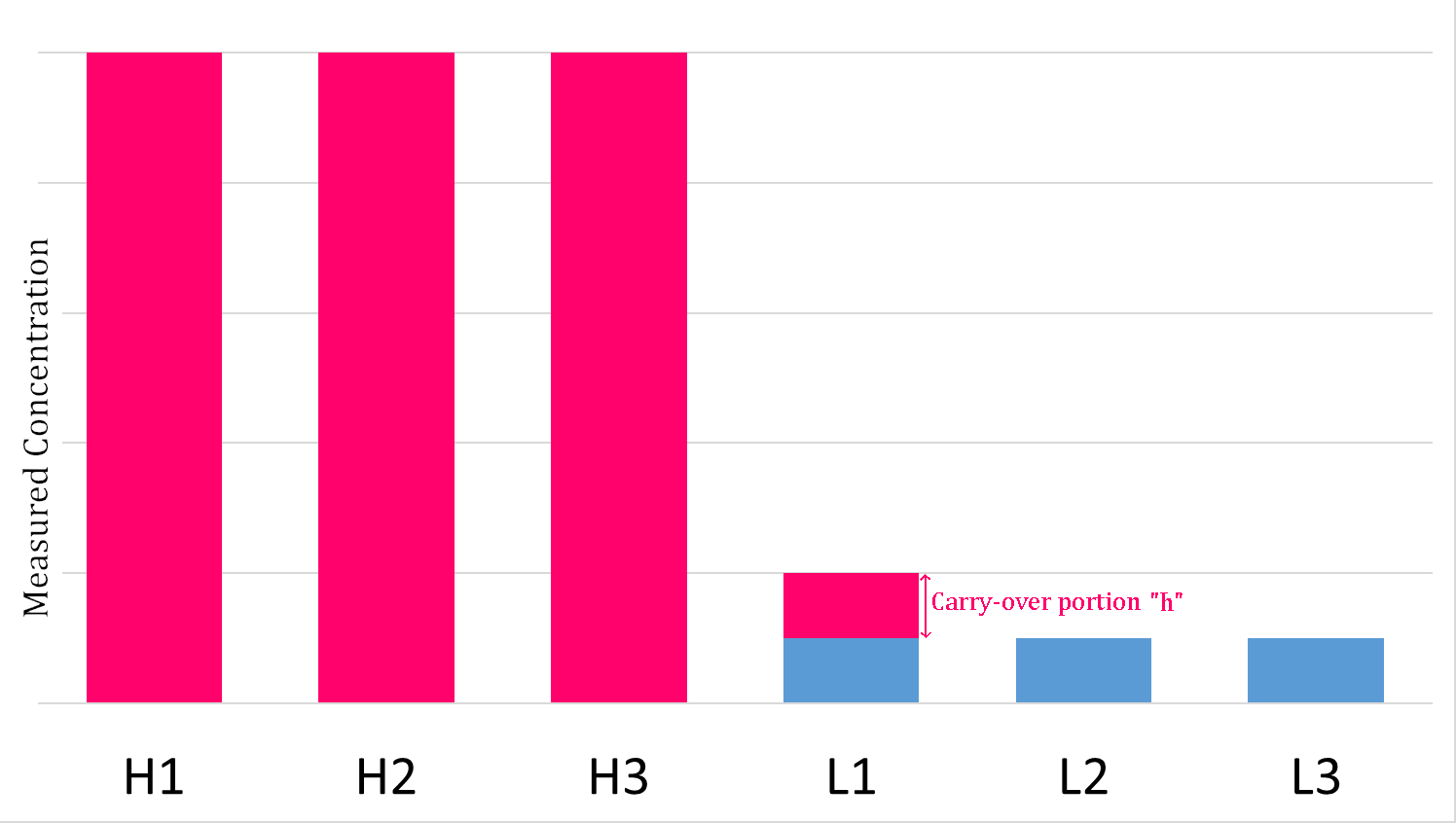
Carryover illustration in a typical carryover study in automated analyzer

IUPAC made a recommendation in 1991 for the description and measurement of carryover effects in clinical chemistry. The carryover ratio is the percentage of H3 carry to L1 constituting the carryover portion "h". In a design of 3 high samples followed by 3 low samples, h can be calculated as (L1 - mean of L2&L3) / (H3 - mean of L2&L3)

The carry-over ratio's acceptance criteria depend on the measurement and the laboratory concerned. For example, 1% carryover of plasma albumin would generally lead to a clinically insignificant effect, while 1% carryover of cardiac High sensitivity Troponin assay would be catastrophic.
