= Subgroup analysis =

Subgroup analysis refers to repeating the analysis of a study within subgroups of subjects defined by a subgrouping variable. For example: smoking status defining two subgroups: smokers and non-smokers.

== See also ==
- Post hoc analysis
