= Conditional logistic regression =

Statistical technique

Conditional logistic regression is an extension of logistic regression that allows one to account for stratification and matching. Its main field of application is observational studies and in particular epidemiology. It was devised in 1978 by Norman Breslow, Nicholas Day, Katherine Halvorsen, Ross L. Prentice and C. Sabai. It is the most flexible and general procedure for matched data.

== Background ==
Observational studies use stratification or matching as a way to control for confounding.

Logistic regression can account for stratification by having a different constant term for each stratum. Let us denote $Y_{i\ell}\in\{0,1\}$ the label (e.g. case status) of the $\ell$th observation of the $i$th stratum and $X_{i\ell}\in\mathbb{R}^p$ the values of the corresponding predictors. We then take the likelihood of one observation to be

$$\mathbb{P}(Y_{i\ell}=1|X_{i\ell})=\frac{\exp(\alpha_i + \boldsymbol\beta^\top X_{i\ell})}{1+\exp(\alpha_i + \boldsymbol\beta^\top X_{i\ell})}$$

where $\alpha_i$ is the constant term for the $i$th stratum. The parameters in this model can be estimated using maximum likelihood estimation.

For example, consider estimating the impact of exercise on the risk of cardiovascular disease. If people who exercise more are younger, have better access to healthcare, or have other differences that improve their health, then a logistic regression of cardiovascular disease incidence on minutes spent exercising may overestimate the impact of exercise on health. To address this, we can group people based on demographic characteristics like age and zip code of their home residence. Each stratum $i$ is a group of people with similar demographics. The vector $X_{i\ell}$ contains information about the variable of interest (in this case, minutes spent exercising) for individual $\ell$ in stratum $i$. The value $\alpha_i$ is the impact of demographics on cardiovascular disease incidence $Y_{i\ell}$, which is assumed to be the same for all people in the stratum. The vector $\boldsymbol\beta$ (which, in this example, is just a scalar) is the quantity of interest --- the impact of exercise on cardiovascular disease. We can also include control variables within $X_{i\ell}$.

== Motivation ==
Logistic regression as described above works satisfactorily when the number of strata is small relative to the amount of data. If we hold the number of strata fixed and increase the amount of data, estimates of the model parameters ($\alpha_i$ for each stratum and the vector $\boldsymbol\beta$) converge to their true values.

Pathological behavior, however, occurs when we have many small strata because the number of parameters grow with the amount of data. For example, if each stratum contains two datapoints, then the number of parameters in a model with $N$ datapoints is $N/2 + p$, so the number of parameters is of the same order as the number of datapoints. In these settings, as we increase the amount of data, the asymptotic results on which maximum likelihood estimation is based on are not valid and the resulting estimates are biased. Conditional logistic regression fixes this issue. In fact, it can be shown that the unconditional analysis of matched pair data results in an estimate of the odds ratio which is the square of the correct, conditional one.

In addition to tests based on logistic regression, several other tests existed before conditional logistic regression for matched data as shown in related tests. However, they did not allow for the analysis of continuous predictors with arbitrary stratum size. All of those procedures also lack the flexibility of conditional logistic regression and in particular the possibility to control for covariates.

== Conditional likelihood ==
Conditional logistic regression uses a conditional likelihood approach that deals with the above pathological behavior by conditioning on the number of cases in each stratum. This eliminates the need to estimate the strata parameters.

When the strata are pairs, where the first observation is a case and the second is a control, this can be seen as follows

$$\begin{align}
& \mathbb{P}(Y_{i1}=1,Y_{i2}=0|X_{i1},X_{i2},Y_{i1}+Y_{i2}=1) \\
& =\frac{\mathbb{P}(Y_{i1}=1|X_{i1}) \mathbb{P}(Y_{i2}=0|X_{i2})}{\mathbb{P}(Y_{i1}=1|X_{i1}) \mathbb{P}(Y_{i2}=0|X_{i2})+\mathbb{P}(Y_{i1}=0|X_{i1}) \mathbb{P}(Y_{i2}=1|X_{i2})}\\[6pt]
\ & =\frac{\frac{\exp(\alpha_i+\boldsymbol{\beta}^\top X_{i1})}{1+\exp(\alpha_i+\boldsymbol{\beta}^\top X_{i1})}\times\frac{1}{1+\exp(\alpha_i+\boldsymbol{\beta}^\top X_{i2})}}{\frac{\exp(\alpha_i+\boldsymbol{\beta}^\top X_{i1})}{1+\exp(\alpha_i+\boldsymbol{\beta}^\top X_{i1})}\times\frac{1}{1+\exp(\alpha_i+\boldsymbol{\beta}^\top X_{i2})}+\frac{1}{1+\exp(\alpha_i+\boldsymbol{\beta}^\top X_{i1})}\times\frac{\exp(\alpha_i+\boldsymbol{\beta}^\top X_{i2})}{1+\exp(\alpha_i+\boldsymbol{\beta}^\top X_{i2})}}\\[6pt]
\ & =\frac{\exp(\boldsymbol{\beta}^\top X_{i1})}{\exp(\boldsymbol{\beta}^\top X_{i1})+\exp(\boldsymbol{\beta}^\top X_{i2})}. \\[6pt]
\end{align}$$

With similar computations, the conditional likelihood of a stratum of size $m$, with the $k$ first observations being the cases, is

$$\mathbb{P}(Y_{ij}=1\text{ for }j\leq k,Y_{ij}=0\text{ for } k<j\leq m|X_{i1},...,X_{im},\sum_{j=1}^m Y_{ij}=k)=\frac{\exp(\sum_{j=1}^k \boldsymbol{\beta}^\top X_{ij})}{\sum_{J\in \mathcal{C} _{k}^{m}}  \exp(\sum_{j\in J}\boldsymbol{\beta}^\top X_{ij})},$$

where $\mathcal{C} _{k}^{m}$ is the set of all subsets of size $k$ of the set $\{1,...,m\}$.

The full conditional log likelihood is then simply the sum of the log likelihoods for each stratum. The estimator is then defined as the $\beta$ that maximizes the conditional log likelihood.

== Implementation ==
Conditional logistic regression is available in R as the function clogit in the survival package. It is in the survival package because the log likelihood of a conditional logistic model is the same as the log likelihood of a Cox model with a particular data structure.

It is also available in python through the statsmodels package starting with version 0.14.

== Related tests ==
- A paired difference test can test the association between a binary outcome and a continuous predictor while taking into account pairing.
- A Cochran-Mantel-Haenszel test can test the association between a binary outcome and a binary predictor while taking into account stratification with arbitrary strata size. When its conditions of application are verified, it is identical to the conditional logistic regression score test.
