= Triss (disambiguation) =

Triss is a 2002 fantasy novel by Brian Jacques.

Triss may also refer to:

- Triss Merigold, a character from The Witcher saga
- A brand of Svenska Spel, Sweden
- Triss King, a former drummer for A Witness, an English post-punk/indie rock band
- Triss Duncan, the bass for The Hurricanes
- TRISS, Trauma and Injury Severity Score
