= American Burn Association =

Nonprofit medical organization

- Formation: 1967
- Founder: Bruce G. MacMillan, Curtis P. Artz, B. W. Hayes, Irving Feller, John A. Boswick Jr.
- Type: Nonprofit
- Headquarters: Chicago, Illinois
- Current President: Ingrid Parry, MS, PT, BT-C
- Website: https://www.ameriburn.org

The American Burn Association (ABA) is a member-based organization of professionals dedicated to burn injury treatment, research, education, and prevention. The 2,000+ members of the ABA span multiple disciplines that specialize in burns, including physicians, surgeons, nurses, physical and occupational therapists, firefighters, social workers, researchers, and hospitals with burn centers. Since it was founded in 1967, the ABA has created a variety of programs in an effort to improve the lives of those affected by burn injuries.

== History ==
After World War II, interest in burn care grew among medical professionals. This is most likely due to the amount of burn injuries sustained during the war, as well as the growing fear of a nuclear war which could result in an unprecedented amount of burn injuries. In 1959, thirteen surgeons from nine institutions held the first National Burn Seminar at the Brooke Army Medical Center in Texas to discuss case studies, treatment techniques, and specific issues in the field. In the following years, further National Burn Seminars were held at different medical centers across the United States and steadily gained more participants. At the Seventh National Burn Seminar in 1966, a committee was appointed to plan a national organization centered on burn care. The organization would be unique in that it would include people from multiple professions (doctors, nurses, allied healthcare professionals) as part of the whole burn care team. The day after the eighth National Burn Seminar in 1967, the committee finalized the bylaws for the American Burn Association, and appointed its officers. The first president of the ABA was trauma surgeon and burn specialist Curtis P. Artz.

== Programs ==
=== Burn center verification ===
While there are 129 burn centers in the US, only 71 are verified burn centers, meaning they meet specific criteria set by the ABA and the American College of Surgeons (ACS). In order to become verified, the burn center must go through an extensive process in which the ABA and ACS review the facility's resources, burn team personnel and training, and the center's ability to provide long-term, ongoing care for burn patients.

=== Education ===
The Board of Certification for Emergency Nurses is working with the ABA to develop the Certified Burn Registered Nurse certification, the first burn nursing specialty certification in the world. Nurses were to be able to take the exam starting in 2023.

The ABA Advanced Burn Life Support certification is accredited by the Accreditation Council for Continuing Medical Education. It focuses on emergent and immediate care for burn patients within the first 24-hours of sustaining their injuries and encompasses information relevant to a variety of professions involved in burn care.

=== Research and publications ===
The Journal of Burn Care & Research (JBCR) is the official journal of the ABA, and is currently the only medical journal in the US dedicated exclusively to burn care. It began publication in September 1980 as The Journal of Burn Care & Rehabilitation and obtained its present title in 2006. JCBR has published a series of practice guidelines in an effort to standardize burn care. The original practice guidelines were first published in 2000, and later revised by the ABA's Committee on the Organization and Delivery of Burn Care in 2006. Since, there have been a variety of articles expanding upon the guidelines and contributing to the discourse surrounding practices such as pain management, nutrition, managing electrical injuries, preventing and treating necrotizing soft-tissue infections, and the use of orthoses.

The American Burn Research Network (ABuRN) facilitates research and clinical trials affiliated with the ABA.

The ABA's Burn Care Quality Platform is a dataset of burn research that is provided voluntarily by burn centers each year. Access to the dataset is available to researchers, advocacy groups, and clinicians upon request.

=== Prevention and advocacy ===
The first full week of February is National Burn Awareness Week.

== See also ==
- Trauma Quality Improvement Organization
