= Katherine Halvorsen =

American statistician

Katherine Taylor Halvorsen is an American statistician and statistics educator whose research topics have included statistical significance for contingency tables, and the conditional logistic regression method for analysis of multiple risk factors in case–control studies. She was co-author of four editions of Mathematics Education in the United States, a quadrennial review publication of the National Council of Teachers of Mathematics, and serves on the Mathematical Sciences Academic Advisory Committee of the College Board.

== Education and career ==
Halvorsen is a graduate of the University of Michigan. After earning master's degrees from Boston University and in 1978, the University of Washington, she completed her Ph.D. in biostatistics in 1984 at the Harvard School of Public Health, with the dissertation Estimating Population Parameters Using Information from Several Independent Sources supervised by Frederick Mosteller. She is a professor emerita of mathematics and statistics at Smith College, where she was founding director of the Five College Statistics Program in 2011.

== Recognition ==
She was named a Fellow of the American Statistical Association in 2008.
