= Nathan Mantel =

American biostatistician

- Born: February 16, 1919; New York
- Died: May 25, 2002 (aged 83); Potomac, Maryland
- Occupation: biostatistician
- Known for: Mantel test

Nathan Mantel (February 16, 1919 – May 25, 2002) was an American biostatistician best known for his work with William Haenszel that led to the Mantel–Haenszel test and its associated estimate, the Mantel–Haenszel odds ratio. The Mantel–Haenszel procedure and its extensions allow data from several sources or groups to be combined while avoiding confounding.

He spent much of his career working for the National Cancer Institute. During his career, he published over 380 academic papers. Later in his life, Mantel was known for defending the tobacco industry against claims that passive smoking was harmful.

== See also ==
- Mantel test
- Logrank test
