= Curtis P. Artz =

American surgeon

Curtis P. Artz (1915–1977) was an American trauma surgeon and burn care specialist. He served in the U.S. Army working in surgical research, founded and led several organizations dedicated to surgery and burn care, published medical textbooks and academic articles, and taught as a professor of surgery at multiple colleges and universities throughout the U.S.

== Early life ==
Artz was born in central Ohio and went on to earn his bachelor's and M.D. degrees from Ohio State University. There he met his wife, Lucy, and they were married in 1939. In 1940, Artz was a resident at the Camden-Clark Memorial Hospital in Parkersburg, West Virginia, and soon after began general practice in Calhoun County, West Virginia. While working in Calhoun County in 1941, Artz was commended for his treatment of a 64-year-old man who experienced an accident causing severe trauma to his leg. Artz treated the patient using a dried powdered form of blood plasma, as an alternative to blood transfusion, which was a new development in medical technology at the time. An ambulance transported the patient to a nearby hospital in Parkersburg, where Artz successfully amputated the patient's leg. In 1943, Artz treated a three-year-old girl who suffered serious burn injuries, but did not survive.

== Military service ==
In 1948, Artz joined the United States Army. He worked at several Army hospitals across the country, most notably the Brooke Army Hospital, where he became Chief of Research and Commanding Officer of the US Army Surgical Research Unit.

During the Korean War, Artz served as director of the 46th Mobile Army Surgical Hospital. There his team treated over 250 patients with battle wounds, mostly abdominal wounds, and focused on reducing fatalities among trauma patients. The patients were the subject of four volumes of published research. In 1956, Artz suffered a heart attack and was medically discharged.

== Contributions ==
In 1960, Artz and James Hardy co-authored the textbook Complications in Surgery, which covered everything from wounds to organ transplants. The textbook soon became standard reading for resident surgeons.

In 1967, Artz worked with biomechanical engineer Tom Hargest to patent the air-fluidized bed, which eliminates the need for manually turning wound care patients. The bed, marketed by the SSI as the Clinitron bed, gives the patient a sensation of "floating" by allowing their body weight to be evenly distributed across a large surface area. The bed also uses pressurized warm air to move small ceramic beads around under the patient, encouraging the continuous movement and circulation of fluid.

== Involvement in organizations ==
Throughout his career, Artz served as a leader and founder of multiple organizations.

Organization	Role
American Burn Association	Founding member, first president
American Association for the Surgery of Trauma	President
American Trauma Society	Founding member, president
Southeastern Surgical Congress	President
American College of Surgeons	Vice President
ACS Committee on Trauma	Chairman
ACS Board of Governors	Vice chairman
Committee on Trauma National Research Council	Chairman
Parkersburg Academy of Medicine	President
Medical University of South Carolina	Chairman, Chief of Surgery

The Medical University of South Carolina Curtis P. Artz Surgical Society was founded and named after him in 1974.

== See also ==
- James Hardy
- Brooke Army Medical Center
- American Burn Association
