= Mantel test =

Statistical test

The Mantel test, named after Nathan Mantel, is a statistical test of the correlation between two matrices. The matrices must be of the same dimension; in most applications, they are matrices of interrelations between the same vectors of objects. The test was first published by Nathan Mantel, a biostatistician at the National Institutes of Health, in 1967. Accounts of it can be found in advanced statistics books (e.g., Sokal & Rohlf 1995).

== Usage ==
The test is commonly used in ecology, where the data are usually estimates of the "distance" between objects such as species of organisms. For example, one matrix might contain estimates of the genetic distances (i.e., the amount of difference between two different genomes) between all possible pairs of species in the study, obtained by the methods of molecular systematics; while the other might contain estimates of the geographical distance between the ranges of each species to every other species. In this case, the hypothesis being tested is whether the variation in genetics for these organisms is correlated to the variation in geographical distance.

== Method ==
If there are n objects, and the matrix is symmetrical (so the distance from object a to object b is the same as the distance from b to a) such a matrix contains

$${\frac{n(n-1)}{2}}$$

distances. Because distances are not independent of each other – since changing the "position" of one object would change $n-1$ of these distances (the distance from that object to each of the others) – the relationship cannot be assessed between the two matrices by simply evaluating the correlation coefficient between the two sets of distances and testing its statistical significance. The Mantel test deals with this problem.

The procedure adopted is a kind of randomization or permutation test. The correlation between the two sets of $n(n-1)/2$ distances is calculated, and this is both the measure of correlation reported and the test statistic on which the test is based. In principle, any correlation coefficient could be used, but normally the Pearson product-moment correlation coefficient is used.

In contrast to the ordinary use of the correlation coefficient, to assess significance of any apparent departure from a zero correlation, the rows and columns of one of the matrices are subjected to random permutations many times, with the correlation being recalculated after each permutation. The significance of the observed correlation is the proportion of such permutations that lead to a higher correlation coefficient.

The reasoning is that if the null hypothesis of there being no relation between the two matrices is true, then permuting the rows and columns of the matrix should be equally likely to produce a larger or a smaller coefficient. In addition to overcoming the problems arising from the statistical dependence of elements within each of the two matrices, use of the permutation test means that no reliance is being placed on assumptions about the statistical distributions of elements in the matrices.

Many statistical packages include routines for carrying out the Mantel test.

== Criticism ==
The various papers introducing the Mantel test (and its extension, the partial Mantel test) lack a clear statistical framework specifying fully the null and alternative hypotheses. This may convey the wrong idea that these tests are universal. For example, the Mantel and partial Mantel tests can be flawed in the presence of spatial auto-correlation and return erroneously low p-values. See, e.g., Guillot and Rousset (2013).

== See also ==
- Non-parametric statistics
- Sørensen–Dice coefficient
