= Jane Worcester =

American biostatistician and epidemiologist

- Died: 8 October 1989; Falmouth, Massachusetts
- Education: Smith College, Harvard University
- Awards: Fellow of the American Statistical Association
- Scientific career
- Fields: Biostatistics, Epidemiology
- Workplaces: Harvard School of Public Health
- Thesis: The Epidemiology of Streptococcal and Non-Streptococcal Respiratory Disease (1947)
- Doctoral advisor: Edwin B. Wilson

Jane Worcester (died 8 October 1989) was a biostatistician and epidemiologist who became the second tenured female professor, after Martha May Eliot, and the first female chair of biostatistics in the Harvard School of Public Health.

== Biography ==
Worcester graduated from Smith College in 1931, with a bachelor's degree in mathematics, and was hired by Harvard biostatistician Edwin B. Wilson to become a human computer at Harvard. She was hired because of her strong background in statistics. They continued to work together on theoretical research in biostatistics until Wilson retired as chair of the department in 1945, eventually publishing 27 papers together. Worcester completed a Ph.D. in epidemiology at Harvard under Wilson's supervision in 1947; her dissertation was The Epidemiology of Streptococcal and Non-Streptococcal Respiratory Disease.

She joined the Harvard faculty, was granted tenure in 1962, and succeeded Robert Reed as chair of the Department of Biostatistics in 1974 until 1977, when she retired.

She moved to Falmouth on Cape Cod and died there on October 8, 1989 at 88 years of age.

== Selected works ==
- Jick, Hershel, Barbro Westerholm, Martin P Vessey, George P Lewis, Dennis Slone, William H W. Inman, Samuel Shapiro, and Jane Worcester. "Venous thromboembolic disease and ABO blood type: a cooperative study." The Lancet 293, no. 7594 (1969): 539-542.
- MacMahon, Brian, and Jane Worcester. "Age at Menopause, United States, 1960-1962." (1966).
- McArthur, JanetW., Francis M. Ingersoll, and Jane Worcester. "The urinary excretion of interstitial-cell and follicle-stimulating hormone activity by women with diseases of the reproductive system." The Journal of Clinical Endocrinology & Metabolism 18, no. 11 (1958): 1202-1215.
- Wilson, Edwin B., and Jane Worcester. "The law of mass action in epidemiology." Proceedings of the National Academy of Sciences 31, no. 1 (1945): 24-34.
- Wilson, Edwin B., and Jane Worcester. "The law of mass action in epidemiology: II." Proceedings of the National Academy of Sciences 31, no. 4 (1945): 109-116.

== Awards and honors ==
She became a Fellow of the American Statistical Association in 1960. In 1968, Smith College awarded her an honorary doctorate.
