= William M. Haenszel =

American epidemiologist (1910–1998)

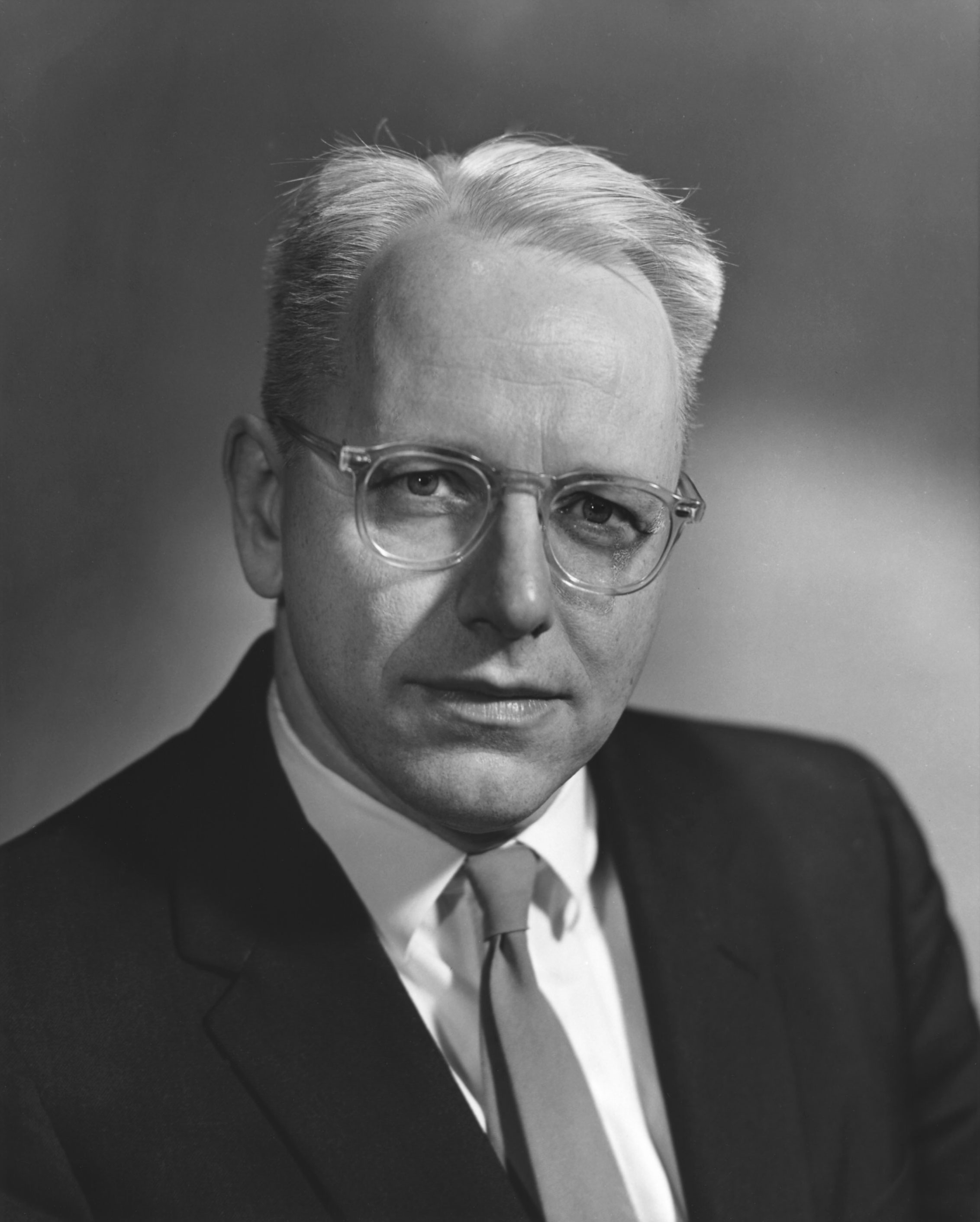
William M. Haenszel

William Manning Haenszel (June 19, 1910 – March 13, 1998) was an American epidemiologist who developed the first national system to track cancer cases and their possible causes (Surveillance, Epidemiology, and End Results or SEER). He was an elected fellow of the American Statistical Association, the American Public Health Association, and the American Association For the Advancement of Science. He worked at the National Cancer Institute from 1952 to 1976, when he became a Professor of Epidemiology at the University of Illinois. With Nathan Mantel, he co-authored the Mantel–Haenszel statistical test for omitted variables.

== Early life and education ==
Haenszel was born on June 19, 1910, in Rochester, New York. He received his B.A. in sociology and mathematics from the University of Buffalo in 1931 and his M.A. in statistics there in 1932.
