= Y-intercept =

Point in function graphs

Graph $y=f(x)$ with the $x$-axis as the horizontal axis and the $y$-axis as the vertical axis. The $y$-intercept of $f(x)$ is indicated by the red dot at $(x=0, y=1)$.

Graph of a function depicting its Y-intercept on the Y-axis, with coordinates $(0, b)$

In analytic geometry, using the common convention that the horizontal axis represents a variable $x$ and the vertical axis represents a variable $y$, a $y$-intercept or vertical intercept is a point where the graph of a function or relation intersects the $y$-axis of the coordinate system. As such, these points satisfy $x = 0$.

== Using equations ==
If the curve in question is given as $y = f(x),$ the $y$-coordinate of the $y$-intercept is found by calculating $f(0)$. Functions which are undefined at $x = 0$ have no $y$-intercept.

If the function is linear and is expressed in slope-intercept form as $f(x) = a + bx$, the constant term $a$ is the $y$-coordinate of the $y$-intercept.

== Multiple $y$-intercepts ==
Some 2-dimensional mathematical relationships such as circles, ellipses, and hyperbolas can have more than one $y$-intercept. Because functions associate $x$-values to no more than one $y$-value as part of their definition, they can have at most one $y$-intercept.

== $x$-intercepts ==
Analogously, an $x$-intercept is a point where the graph of a function or relation intersects with the $x$-axis. As such, these points satisfy $y = 0$. The zeros, or roots, of such a function or relation are the $x$-coordinates of these $x$-intercepts.

Functions of the form $y = f(x)$ have at most one $y$-intercept, but may contain multiple $x$-intercepts. The $x$-intercepts of functions, if any exist, are often more difficult to locate than the $y$-intercept, as finding the $y$-intercept involves simply evaluating the function at $x = 0$.

== In higher dimensions ==
The notion may be extended for 3-dimensional space and higher dimensions, as well as for other coordinate axes, possibly with other names. For example, one may speak of the $I$-intercept of the current–voltage characteristic of, say, a diode. (In electrical engineering, $I$ is the symbol used for electric current.)

== See also ==
- Regression intercept
