= Stratification (clinical trials) =

Stratification of clinical trials is the partitioning of subjects and results by a factor other than the treatment given.

Stratification can be used to ensure equal allocation of subgroups of participants to each experimental condition. This may be done by gender, age, or other demographic factors. Stratification can be used to control for confounding variables (variables other than those the researcher is studying), thereby making it easier for the research to detect and interpret relationships between variables. For example, if doing a study of fitness where age or gender was expected to influence the outcomes, participants could be stratified into groups by the confounding variable. A limitation of this method is that it requires knowledge of what variables need to be controlled.

== Types of stratification ==
Stratified random sampling designs divide the population into homogeneous strata, and an appropriate number of participants are chosen at random from each stratum. Proportionate stratified sampling involves selecting participants from each stratum in proportions that match the general population. This method can be used to improve the sample's representation of the population, by ensuring that characteristics (and their proportions) of the study sample reflect the characteristics of the population. Alternatively, disproportionate sampling can be used when the strata being compared differ greatly in size, as this allows for minorities to be sufficiently represented.

Stratification is sometimes called blocking, and may be used in randomized block design.

Stratified purposive sampling is a type of typical case sampling, and is used to get a sample of cases that are "average", "above average", and "below average" on a particular variable; this approach generates three strata, or levels, each of which is relatively homogeneous, or alike.

Stratification is used in quota sampling, a non-random method in which the researcher identifies strata of the population and pre-determines how many participants are needed from each stratum. This is considered a better method than convenience sampling, as it attempts to ensure different strata are properly represented.

== See also ==
- Stratified sampling
- Glossary of clinical research
