= Hazard ratio =

Medical ratio

In survival analysis, the hazard ratio (HR) is the ratio of the hazard rates corresponding to the conditions characterised by two distinct levels of a treatment variable of interest.

For example, in a clinical study of a drug, the treated population may die at twice the rate of the control population. The hazard ratio would be 2, indicating a higher hazard of death from the treatment.

For example, a scientific paper might use an HR to state something such as: "Adequate COVID-19 vaccination status was associated with significantly decreased risk for the composite of severe COVID-19 or mortality with a[n] HR of 0.20 (95% CI, 0.17–0.22)." In essence, the hazard for the composite outcome was 80% lower among the vaccinated relative to those who were unvaccinated in the same study. So, for a hazardous outcome (e.g., severe disease or death), an HR below 1 indicates that the treatment (e.g., vaccination) is protective against the outcome of interest. In other cases, an HR greater than 1 indicates the treatment is favorable. For example, if the outcome is actually favorable (e.g., accepting a job offer to end a spell of unemployment), an HR greater than 1 indicates that seeking a job is favorable to not seeking one (if "treatment" is defined as seeking a job).

Hazard ratios differ from relative risks (RRs) and odds ratios (ORs) in that RRs and ORs are cumulative over an entire study, using a defined endpoint, while HRs represent instantaneous risk over the study time period, or some subset thereof. Hazard ratios suffer somewhat less from selection bias with respect to the endpoints chosen and can indicate risks that happen before the endpoint.

== Definition and derivation ==
Regression models are used to obtain hazard ratios and their confidence intervals.

The instantaneous hazard rate is the limit of the number of events per unit time divided by the number at risk, as the time interval approaches 0:

$$h(t) = \lim_{\Delta t \to 0} \frac{\text{observed events in interval}\ [t, t + \Delta t]/N(t)}{\Delta t},$$

where N(t) is the number at risk at the beginning of an interval. A hazard is the probability that a patient fails between $t$ and $t + \Delta t$, given that they have survived up to time $t$, divided by $\Delta t$, as $\Delta t$ approaches zero.

The hazard ratio is the effect on this hazard rate of a difference, such as group membership (for example, treatment or control, male or female), as estimated by regression models that treat the logarithm of the HR as a function of a baseline hazard $h_0(t)$ and a linear combination of explanatory variables:

$$\log h(t) = f\big(h_0(t), \alpha + \beta_1 X_1 + \cdots + \beta_k X_k\big).$$

Such models are generally classed proportional hazards regression models; the best known being the Cox proportional hazards model, and the exponential, Gompertz and Weibull parametric models.

For two groups that differ only in treatment condition, the ratio of the hazard functions is given by $e^\beta$, where $\beta$ is the estimate of treatment effect derived from the regression model. This hazard ratio, that is, the ratio between the predicted hazard for a member of one group and that for a member of the other group, is given by holding everything else constant, i.e. assuming proportionality of the hazard functions.

For a continuous explanatory variable, the same interpretation applies to a unit difference. Other HR models have different formulations and the interpretation of the parameter estimates differs accordingly.

== Interpretation ==
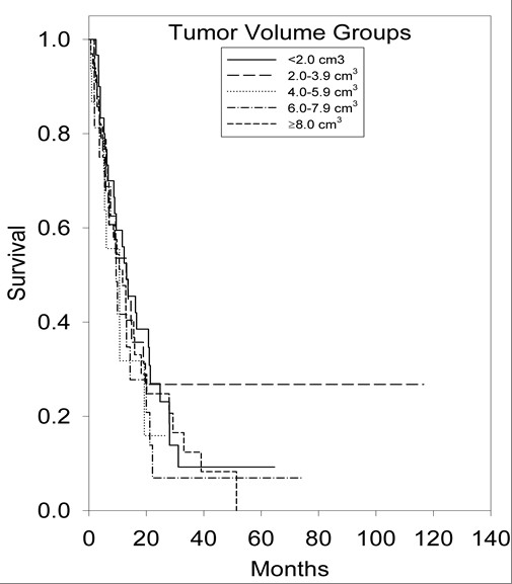
Kaplan-Meier curve illustrating overall survival based on volume of brain metastases. Elaimy et al. (2011)

In its simplest form, the hazard ratio can be interpreted as the chance of an event occurring in the treatment arm divided by the chance of the event occurring in the control arm, or vice versa, of a study. The resolution of these endpoints are usually depicted using Kaplan–Meier survival curves. These curves relate the proportion of each group where the endpoint has not been reached. The endpoint could be any dependent variable associated with the covariate (independent variable), e.g. death, remission of disease or contraction of disease. The curve represents the odds of an endpoint having occurred at each point in time (the hazard). The hazard ratio is simply the relationship between the instantaneous hazards in the two groups and represents, in a single number, the magnitude of distance between the Kaplan–Meier plots.

Hazard ratios do not reflect a time unit of the study. The difference between hazard-based and time-based measures is akin to the difference between the odds of winning a race and the margin of victory. When a study reports one hazard ratio per time period, it is assumed that difference between groups was proportional. Hazard ratios become meaningless when this assumption of proportionality is not met.

If the proportional hazard assumption holds, a hazard ratio of one means equivalence in the hazard rate of the two groups, whereas a hazard ratio other than one indicates difference in hazard rates between groups. The researcher indicates the probability of this sample difference being due to chance by reporting the probability associated with some test statistic. For instance, the $\beta$ from the Cox-model or the log-rank test might then be used to assess the significance of any differences observed in these survival curves.

Conventionally, probabilities lower than 0.05 are considered significant and researchers provide a 95% confidence interval for the hazard ratio, e.g. derived from the standard deviation of the Cox-model regression coefficient, i.e. $\beta$. Statistically significant hazard ratios cannot include unity (one) in their confidence intervals.

=== The proportional hazards assumption ===
The proportional hazards assumption for hazard ratio estimation is strong and often unreasonable. Complications, adverse effects and late effects are all possible causes of change in the hazard rate over time. For instance, a surgical procedure may have high early risk, but excellent long term outcomes.

If the hazard ratio between groups remain constant, this is not a problem for interpretation. However, interpretation of hazard ratios become impossible when selection bias exists between groups. For instance, a particularly risky surgery might result in the survival of a systematically more robust group who would have fared better under any of the competing treatment conditions, making it look as if the risky procedure was better. Follow-up time is also important. A cancer treatment associated with better remission rates might on follow-up be associated with higher relapse rates. The researchers' decision about when to follow up is arbitrary and may lead to very different reported hazard ratios.

=== The hazard ratio and survival ===
Hazard ratios are often treated as a ratio of death probabilities. For example, a hazard ratio of 2 may mistakenly be thought to mean that a group has twice the chance of dying than a comparison group. To see why this is wrong, we consider a case when the proportional hazard assumption holds. In that case the hazard ratio can be shown to translate to the following relationship between group survival functions: $S_1(t) = S_0(t)^r$ (where r is the hazard ratio). Therefore, with a hazard ratio of 2, if $S_0(t) = 0.2$ (20% survived at time t), $S_1(t) = 0.2^2 = 0.04$ (4% survived at t). The corresponding death probabilities are 0.8 and 0.96. It should be clear that the hazard ratio is a relative measure of effect and is not a measure of absolute risk.

While hazard ratios allow for hypothesis testing, they should be considered alongside other measures for interpretation of the treatment effect, e.g. the ratio of median times (median ratio) at which treatment and control group participants are at some endpoint. If the analogy of a race is applied, the hazard ratio is equivalent to the odds that an individual in the group with the higher hazard reaches the end of the race first. The probability of being first can be derived from the odds, which is the probability of being first divided by the probability of not being first:

$\mathit{HR} = \frac P{1 - P}$; conversely, $P = \frac{\mathit{HR}}{1 + \mathit{HR}}$.

In the previous example, a hazard ratio of 2 corresponds to a 67% chance of an early death. The hazard ratio does not convey information about how soon the death will occur.

=== The hazard ratio, treatment effect and time-based endpoints ===
Treatment effect depends on the underlying disease related to survival function, not just the hazard ratio. Since the hazard ratio does not give us direct time-to-event information, researchers have to report median endpoint times and calculate the median endpoint time ratio by dividing the control group median value by the treatment group median value.

While the median endpoint ratio is a relative speed measure, the hazard ratio is not. The relationship between treatment effect and the hazard ratio is given as $e^\beta$. A statistically important, but practically insignificant effect can produce a large hazard ratio, e.g. a treatment increasing the number of one-year survivors in a population from one in 10,000 to one in 1,000 has a hazard ratio of 10. It is unlikely that such a treatment would have had much impact on the median endpoint time ratio, which likely would have been close to unity, i.e. mortality was largely the same regardless of group membership and clinically insignificant.

By contrast, a treatment group in which 50% of infections are resolved after one week (versus 25% in the control) yields a hazard ratio of two. If it takes ten weeks for all cases in the treatment group and half of cases in the control group to resolve, the ten-week hazard ratio remains at two, but the median endpoint time ratio is ten, a clinically significant difference.

== See also ==
- Survival analysis
- Failure rate and Hazard rate
- Proportional hazards models
- Relative risk
- Odds ratio
