= Paul Meier (statistician) =

American biostatistician

- Born: July 24, 1924; Newark, New Jersey, U.S.
- Died: August 7, 2011 (aged 87); New York City, New York, U.S.
- Education: Oberlin College; Princeton
- Known for: Statistics, experimental design, biostatistics
- Scientific career
- Fields: Statistician
- Workplaces: Princeton; Johns Hopkins; Univ. Chicago; Lehigh University; Columbia
- Doctoral advisor: John Tukey

Paul Meier (July 24, 1924 – August 7, 2011) was a statistician who promoted the use of randomized trials in medicine.

Meier is known for introducing, with Edward L. Kaplan, the Kaplan–Meier estimator, a nonparametric estimator of survival functions that accounts for changes in sample size over time.

Meier's 1957 evaluation of polio vaccine practices published in Science has been described as influential, and the Kaplan–Meier method is thought to have indirectly extended tens of thousands of lives.

== Bibliography ==
- Meier, Paul (1952), Weighted means and lattice designs (Ph.D. Thesis), Princeton University
- Meier, Paul (1953), "Variance of a Weighted Mean", Biometrics, 9 (1): 59–73, doi:10.2307/3001633, JSTOR 3001633
- Meier, Paul (1954), "Analysis of Simple Lattice Designs with Unequal Sets of Replications", Journal of the American Statistical Association, 49 (268): 786–813, doi:10.2307/2281540, JSTOR 2281540
- Meier P (1957), "Safety testing of a poliomyelitis vaccine", Science, 125 (3257): 1067–71, Bibcode:1957Sci...125.1067M, doi:10.1126/science.125.3257.1067, PMC 1824172, PMID 20325578
- Lasagna L, Meier P (1958), "Clinical evaluation of new drugs", Annual Review of Medicine, 9: 347–54, doi:10.1146/annurev.me.09.020158.002023, PMID 13534287
- Kaplan, E. L.; Meier, Paul (1958), "Nonparametric estimation from incomplete observations", Journal of the American Statistical Association, 53 (282): 457–481, doi:10.2307/2281868, JSTOR 2281868
- Meier, Paul (1971), "Report of the Evaluation Committee on the University of Chicago Department of Statistics", The American Statistician, 25 (3): 17–24, doi:10.2307/2683317, JSTOR 2683317
- Meier, Paul (1975), "Statistics and medical experimentation", Biometrics, 31 (2): 511–529, doi:10.2307/2529434, JSTOR 2529434, PMID 1100134
- Meier, Paul (1976), "Estimation of a distribution function from incomplete observations", Perspectives in Probability and Statistics, In Honor of M. S. Bartlett, Academic Press, pp. 67–88
- Meier, Paul (1977), "The biggest health experiment ever: The 1954 field trial of the Salk Poliomyelitis vaccine", Statistics: A Guide to the Study of the Biological and Health Sciences, Holden-Day Inc, pp. 88–100
- Meier, Paul (1979), "Terminating a trial: The ethical problem", Clinical Pharmacology and Therapeutics, 25 (5part2): 633–640, doi:10.1002/cpt1979255part2633, PMID 373945, S2CID 45733370
- Meier, Paul; Zabell, Sandy (1980), "Benjamin Pierce and the Howland will", Journal of the American Statistical Association, 75 (371): 497–506, doi:10.2307/2287637, JSTOR 2287637
- Meier, Paul (1981), "Jerome Cornfield and the methodology of clinical trials", Controlled Clinical Trials, 1 (4): 339–345, doi:10.1016/0197-2456(81)90038-6, PMID 7021066
- Meier, Paul (1981), "Stratification in the design of a clinical trial", Controlled Clinical Trials, 1 (4): 355–361, doi:10.1016/0197-2456(81)90040-4, PMID 7261626
- Meier, Paul (1982), "Current research in statistical methodology for clinical trials", Biometrics -- Proceedings of Current Topics in Biostatistics and Epidemiology: A Memorial Symposium in Honor of Jerome Cornfield, vol. 38 Suppl, The Biometric Society, pp. 141–150, PMID 7046819
- Meier, Paul (1983), Shapiro, Stanley H.; Louis, Thomas A. (eds.), "Statistical analysis of clinical trials", Clinical Trials. Issues and Approaches, Marcel Dekker, pp. 155–189
- Meier, Paul (1984), "Commentary on evaluation of therapies", Statistics in Medicine, 3 (4): 473–475, doi:10.1002/sim.4780030431
- Meier, Paul (1984), Rao, Poduri S. R. S.; Sedransk, Joseph (eds.), "William G. Cochran and public health", W. G. Cochran's Impact on Statistics, John Wiley & Sons, pp. 73–81
- Gilliland, Dennis C.; Meier, Paul (1986), DeGroot, Morris H.; Fienberg, Stephen E.; Kadane, Joseph B. (eds.), "The probability of reversal in contested elections", Statistics and the Law, John Wiley & Sons, pp. 391–411
- Meier, Paul (1986), "Damned liars and expert witnesses", Journal of the American Statistical Association, 81 (394): 269–276, doi:10.2307/2289214, JSTOR 2289214
- Meier, Paul; Sacks, Jerome; Zabell, Sandy L. (1986), DeGroot, Morris H.; Fienberg, Stephen E.; Kadane, Joseph B. (eds.), "What happened in Hazelwood: Statistics, employment discrimination, and the 80 percent rule", Statistics and the Law, John Wiley & Sons, pp. 1–40
- Beach, Michael L.; Meier, Paul (1989), "Choosing covariates in the analysis of clinical trials", Controlled Clinical Trials, 10 (4): 161–175, doi:10.1016/0197-2456(89)90055-X, PMID 2605965
- Meier, Paul (1990), "Polio trial: An early efficient clinical trial", Statistics in Medicine, 9 (1–2): 13–16, doi:10.1002/sim.4780090107, PMID 2189187
- Meier, Paul (1990), "The experimental evaluation of relative risk", Chance, 3 (4): 28–32, doi:10.1080/09332480.1990.11882393
- Meier, Paul; Dinardo, Lawrence C. (1990), "Simpson's paradox in employment litigation", ASA Proceedings of the Social Statistics Section, American Statistical Association, pp. 66–69
- Meier, Paul (1993), "Illusion and reality in the analysis of clinical trials", Statistics in Medicine, 12 (15–16): 1519, doi:10.1002/sim.4780121518
- Meier, Paul; Karrison, Theodore; Chappell, Rick; Xie, Hui (2004), "The Price of Kaplan-Meier", Journal of the American Statistical Association, 99 (467): 890–896, doi:10.1198/016214504000001259, S2CID 53401202
