= Discrete-time proportional hazards =

Concept in survival analysis

In survival analysis, hazard rate models are widely used to model duration data in a wide range of disciplines, from bio-statistics to economics.

Grouped duration data are widespread in many applications. Unemployment durations are typically measured over weeks or months and these time intervals may be considered too large for continuous approximations to hold. In this case, we will typically have grouping points $t_{a}$, where $a=1,...,A.$. Models allow for time-invariant and time-variant covariates, but the latter require stronger assumptions in terms of exogeneity. The discrete-time hazard function can be written as:

$\lambda_{d}(t_{a}| \chi)= Pr(t_{a-1}\leqslant T <t_{a} | T \geqslant t_{a-1},x[t_{a-1}])= \frac{S(t_{a-1} | \chi ) - S(t_{a} | \chi) }{S (t_{a-1}| \chi) }$

where $S(t_{a} |\chi)$ is the survivor function. It can be shown that this can be rewritten as:

$\lambda_{d}(t_{a} | \chi) = 1-exp \biggl(-\int \lambda (s) ds \biggr)= 1-exp \Bigl(-exp (ln\lambda_{0s}+x (t_{s-1})'\beta)\biggl)$

These probabilities provide the building blocks for setting up the Likelihood function, which ends up being:

$L(\beta,\lambda) = \textstyle \prod[\prod exp(-exp(ln\lambda_{0s}+x_{i}(t_{s}-1)'\beta)\bigr)]\times \bigl(1-exp\bigl(-exp (ln\lambda0_{ai}+ x_{i}(t_{a-1})'\beta)\bigr)\Bigr)$

This maximum likelihood maximization depends on the specification of the baseline hazard functions. These specifications include fully parametric models, piece-wise-constant proportional hazard models, or partial likelihood approaches that estimate the baseline hazard as a nuisance function. Alternatively, one can be more flexible for the baseline hazard $\lambda^d_{0}(t)$ and impose more structure for $\lambda^d_{i}(t)=\lambda^d_{0}(t)exp(-x_{i}'\beta).$ This approach performs well for certain measures and can approximate arbitrary hazard functions relatively well, while not imposing stringent computational requirements. When the covariates are omitted from the analysis, the maximum likelihood boils down to the Kaplan-Meier estimator of the survivor function.

Another way to model discrete duration data is to model transitions using binary choice models.
