= Survivorship (disambiguation) =

Survivorship is the state or condition of being a survivor; survival.

It may also refer to:

- Right of survivorship

== See also ==
- Cancer survivorship
- Survivorship bias
- Survivorship curve
