= Controlled clinical trials =

Controlled clinical trial may refer to:

- Clinical trial, the medical research technique
- Contemporary Clinical Trials, the continuation of the discontinued journal Controlled Clinical Trials
