= Deaf culture in New Zealand =

Deaf culture in New Zealand is prevalent. New Zealand Sign Language (NZSL) was first recognised as an official language of the country in 2006. Recent data shows that an estimated 3,000–4,000 people in New Zealand use NZSL as their primary language.

== Human and civil rights for deaf and hard of hearing people ==
=== Convention on the Rights of Persons with Disabilities ===
New Zealand adopted the Convention on the Rights of Persons with Disabilities (CRPD), a treaty of the United Nations, on 13 December 2006 and was ratified on 25 September 2008. There have been no reservations made to the CRPD. The most recent Country Report was filed on 11 October 2019 and the most recent List of Issues was filed on 23 March 2018.

=== New Zealand's State Party Report ===
==== Equal Participation ====
New Zealand's State Party Report addresses equal participation for disabled people under several CRPD articles. Article 5 (Equality and Non-Discrimination) and Article 12 (Equal Recognition before the Law) both guarantee that people with disabilities cannot be discriminated against and are entitled to the same civil and other rights as people without disabilities, although neither article contains provisions specific to DHH people. Article 23 (Respect for the Home and Family) is addressed separately, under Sign Language Rights below.

Under Article 24 (Education), the report states that people with disabilities are guaranteed equal access to education at all levels, from early childhood through to tertiary study, in both public and private institutions, with students' language and culture taken into account when planning their education. Two schools catered specifically to deaf students, at which some students resided on campus. The government allocated approximately $460 million to special education, covering services such as teaching assistance and hearing devices for deaf children, and reported efforts to fund more NZSL teacher and interpreter scholarships and to ensure schools provide a safe, supportive environment for students with special education needs.

==== Sign Language Rights ====
Article 2 (Disabled People and Government Decision-Making) requires disabled people to be considered throughout government affairs, with the government expected to include and consult committees and advisory groups on disability issues, though the article contains no provisions specific to DHH people.

Article 21 (Freedom of Expression and Opinion and Access to Information) underpins the recognition of NZSL as an official language and commits the government to providing resources that support self-expression, such as interpreters in court and government settings, speech-language professionals, and assistive technology.

Article 23 (Respect for the Home and Family) provides that children with disabilities should remain with their families wherever possible, with their wellbeing treated as a primary consideration, and that support is available both to disabled parents raising children and to families caring for a disabled family member; disability support remains available even where a child becomes involved with a social welfare agency. As with Article 2, this article does not specifically address DHH people. Education under Article 24 is discussed further under Lifelong Learning below.

==== Deaf Culture and Linguistic Identity ====
Article 30 (Participation in Cultural Life, Recreation, Leisure and Sport) is supported in New Zealand through organisations such as Creative New Zealand, which runs programmes for people with disabilities to take part in cultural activities, and through government funding that prioritises disabled people's involvement in cultural, sporting, artistic and social activities. The article does not, however, contain provisions specific to DHH people.

==== Bilingual Education ====
Article 24 of the CRPD addresses education, but neither this article nor the rest of New Zealand's State Party Report contains specific information on bilingual education for deaf students, including bilingual education involving NZSL.

==== Lifelong Learning ====
Article 24 (Education) guarantees people with disabilities equal access to both public and private education. Special education services work together with the families of disabled children to plan appropriate support, and students are assessed for developmental or behavioural difficulties before they begin school so that their needs can be addressed from the outset. Students with disabilities also receive financial support for travelling to tertiary institutions. The report identifies a need for a transition programme to help students move from education into the workforce, and notes that efforts are under way to train more NZSL interpreters to address the shortage of teachers and interpreters supporting Deaf children.

==== Accessibility ====
Article 9 (Accessibility) requires that information be accessible to all people; for the Deaf and Hard of Hearing community, this is provided for through NZSL videos in public settings and captions on broadcast content, although New Zealand has no government standard governing accessible communication more broadly. Article 21 is addressed above under Sign Language Rights. Article 26 (Habilitation and Rehabilitation) is supported by government funding for habilitation and rehabilitation programmes that promote independence for people with disabilities, delivered in both hospital and community settings, though the report does not mention provisions specific to the DHH community.

==== Equal Employment Opportunities ====
Article 27 (Work and Employment) entitles people with disabilities to the same workplace rights as people without disabilities, and requires employers to provide a safe working environment and to select employees impartially; the report does not provide information specific to employment for the DHH community.

== Sign language ==
=== New Zealand Sign Language ===
New Zealand Sign Language (NZSL) is a deaf community sign language that has been recognised as an official language of New Zealand since 2006. It is assumed that NZSL was first created in 1880 in the first residential school for Deaf children in the colony. NZSL has relation to both British Sign Language (BSL) and Australian Sign Language (Auslan). BSL, Auslan, and NZSL together form BANZSL, a language family all diverging from BSL at their core. In 2018, there were about 3,000–4,000 deaf people who used NZSL as their primary language, and about 23,000 people in New Zealand who had some knowledge of the language. For reference, the total population of New Zealand in 2018 was about 4.9 million people.

NZSL is known as te reo Turi in Māori, which is the language of the indigenous people of New Zealand. There is no fully developed separate language for Māori sign language, however, there are signs within NZSL that are specific to the Māori people that are referred to as "Māori signs."

New Zealand Sign Language has an Expanded Graded Intergenerational Disruption Scale (EGIDS) rating of 6b, meaning it is threatened. (ethnologue)

== Universal neonatal hearing screening ==
Universal neonatal hearing screening (UNHS) is not mandated in New Zealand, however UNHS is nationally managed, and there is an Early Intervention Programme. As of 2020, 88.2% of newborns are screened. Of those screened, 2.2% are referred for follow-up. Of those referred, 15.8% are lost to follow-up. Per 1000 babies, 1.1 are confirmed to have permanent child hearing loss (PCHL). The average age at which this diagnosis is provided for babies who were screened as infants is 2.1 months. There is no data reported for those who were not screened.

== Early childhood intervention ==
Early Childhood Intervention services for children in New Zealand are provided by the Ministry of Education Learning Support. These services include support from advisors on Deaf children and speech language therapists, among other services. Although these support services are available, as of August 2024 wait times to receive help from people such as speech-language therapists had increased by nearly 20% and averaged a 126 day wait.

Through UNHS screening services, there is a target measurement of having at least 90% of children who need Early Intervention services to begin receiving them by the time they are six months old. Data from 2015 indicates that this target was met, with 97.7% of children beginning Early Intervention service by the time they were six months old.

There is no concrete data figure demonstrating the prevalence of additional disabilities within DHH children, however, there is definitely a high rate of a child having additional disabilities if they have hearing loss.

=== Hearing aids ===
Children and students up to 21 years old are able to receive their hearing aids for free, which is funded by the Ministry of Health. They are also able to get repairs done to their hearing aids for free through Deaf Education Centres. Adults are also able to get government funding through the Ministry of Health for their hearing aids. Some are eligible for free hearing aids, but some may have to contribute their own money.

=== Cochlear implants ===
An organisation called Disability Support Services provides funding for cochlear implant services for people who meet certain criteria, regardless of age. However, only children under 19 can get their repair fees covered through this organisation. The services funded include cochlear implant assessments, the device itself, the procedure, maintenance, etc.

There are two providers who provide implant services depending on what region of New Zealand the child lives in. The Northern Cochlear Implant Programme (NCIP) services Northland, Auckland, Waikato, Bay of Plenty, Rotorua, and Taupō. The rest of New Zealand is serviced by the Southern Cochlear Implant Programme (SCIP). The Ministry of Health also works with NCIP and SCIP to fund cochlear implant services for both children and adults.

=== Access to sign language before schooling ===
There are both in person and online courses offered in New Zealand Sign Language through NZSL4U, however, they are not specified to be targeted towards children/families who have not yet began schooling.

== Education ==
=== Accessibility of deaf education ===
As of 2013, there are two main deaf education schools in New Zealand: Kelston Deaf Education Centre and Van Asch Deaf Education Centre. However, there are an estimated 400,000 DHH individuals living in New Zealand, so many attend local schools instead of travelling to one of these institutions.

In general, all children in New Zealand are required to attend school from the ages of 6–16. Primary and secondary education lasts from ages 5–19. The New Zealand Education Act (1989) states that all children are to have access to free education at any state school from the time they are 5 up until the first day of January after they turn 19

Special Education 2000 was created in the late 1990s to help budget resources for students with special education needs. The goal of this policy is to make sure a system is developed to ensure that students in need of more support receive help according to their personal needs. There is a specific part of the budget (an additional $3.48 million) that is going specifically to students with speech-language difficulties, as well as an additional $325,000 to help provide students with equipment they will need to aid in their learning experience.

=== Deaf education settings ===
==== Specialised schools ====
There is no specific data about how common it is for Deaf and Hard of Hearing students to attend specialised schools vs attending mainstream schools.

There are day specialist schools for students who have "high or complex learning support needs," and DHH people can choose to attend them for either a portion of their education or the entirety of it. These schools provide specialist teachers, speech language therapists, physiotherapists, occupational therapists, and psychologists for DHH students.

There are three residential specialist schools that are located in Auckland, Christchurch, and Nelson (where there is an all-girls school). Students range from 8–15 years old at these schools.

Ko Taku Reo (Deaf Education New Zealand) provides support for DHH students. Examples of this support include allowing students to attend local mainstream schools with a specialist teacher to help them. Additionally, they offer bilingual classes that are taught by Ko Taku Reo teachers.

==== Sign language in schools ====
There is no specific data about how common it is for DHH students to access the curriculum through sign language compared to spoken language.

Ko Taku reo provides services to DHH students. They provide resources and support to help students academically, as well as support that helps ensure their wellbeing and their ability to find themselves and their identity. Other services include: hearing aid servicing, audiology, cochlear implant support, NZSL services, and NZSL tutors

A study was done to examine the use of NZSL compared to. spoken language in schools This study shows that although some schools are teaching NZSL, even to non-DHH students, it is typically being taught by people who have limited knowledge of the language and culture. The students are typically, if at all, being taught vocabulary and a little bit of culture.

==== Inclusivity in schools ====
The 2007 Inclusion Principle states that schools and teachers within them are required to teach a curriculum that is well-rounded and showcases a variety of abilities, languages, identities, and talents of the people in their community. It also states they must provide equal opportunities to learn and help provide resources to students that have different needs. They mention "removing or minimising barriers to learning and wellbeing." They want learning environments to be built with learning supports and flexibility from the beginning.

Inclusivity for Māori people: Ko Taku Reo (Deaf Education New Zealand) has a team dedicated to making sure that Māori students are integrated in the curriculum and are thriving. Both Māori and non-Māori students are given the opportunity to engage with Māori culture, language, and activities. The local Māori Deaf community is also very actively involved with Ko Taku Reo.

=== Interpreter access ===
The Ministry of Education utilises Advisers of Deaf Children (AoDC) to work with DHH children and their families from the time they are born until they are in their third year of schooling. After the student begins early education, the AoDC may refer them to get support from Ko Taku Reo (Deaf Education New Zealand), who provide services such as resource teachers of the Deaf, New Zealand Sign Language tutors, and specialist schools.

The NSZL@School programme was made to help students who primarily use NZSL for their best learning practices. It intends to elevate the learning achievement of DHH students to the same level as that of their hearing peers, and increase the use and fluency of NZSL by DHH students. For this programme, DHH people can get funding from the Ministry of Education

NZSL tutors work one on one with students, as well as collaborating with their families and staff at their schools, to help them with their NZSL and their knowledge of Deaf culture. Sessions are typically done on video call to provide students help throughout the wide geographic regions. Tutors are funded by the Ministry of Education. There is an "ultimate aim of ensuring every Deaf student at a mainstream school receives the best possible education within a responsive and supportive environment."

=== Educational outcomes ===
There is no information regarding the specific literacy rate for DHH or hearing students, as well as the rates of school completion for DHH compared to hearing students. Although there is not specific numerical data, DHH students generally do not do as well in school as hearing students. There was a study done in Southern New Zealand by an Adviser on Deaf Children that found that two-thirds of children under 16 years old who are prelingually, severely, and profoundly deaf could not understand the same reading material that 77% of hearing children in the same age bracket were able to understand.
