= Wayne Nelson (statistician) =

American statistician

For the American musician, see Wayne Nelson.

Wayne Nelson is an American statistician. His main contributions to the reliability theory are the Nelson-Aalen Estimator for lifetime data, various statistical procedures for accelerated life testing and both: nonparametric and parametric procedures for recurrent data analysis.

== Early life and education ==
Nelson was born in Chicago in 1936. He studied Physics at Caltech and graduated with a Bachelor of Science in 1958. Nelson obtained a Master of Science in Physics from the University of Illinois in 1959, then a Ph.D. in statistics from the same university in 1965.

== Career ==
Nelson was employed from 1965 to 1989 at General Electric R&D. He was also an adjunct professor teaching graduate courses on applications of statistics at Union College and Rensselaer Polytechnic Institute. Currently, Nelson works as a private consultant and legal expert witness in statistical analysis and modeling of data in many industries; including automotive, aviation, electric power, electronics, materials, medical devices, microelectronics, military hardware, nuclear power, railroad, software, and transportation.

== Work ==
His research work focuses on collecting and analyzing reliability data, laboratory tests, accelerated tests, quality control, measurement error analysis, planned experiments, sampling, and data analysis. Nelson worked with Odd Aalen on constructing the Nelson Aalen estimator., a non-parametric approximation of the cumulative hazard function that can account for both failure and censored data. He also developed a method to estimate Weibull distribution (with few or no failures) for products with evolutionary design (same shape parameter β). In the late 1960s, Wayne developed a cumulative hazard analysis method for nonparametric estimation of a population's cumulative life distribution. The resulting estimate is most conveniently displayed and interpreted on a probability plot. Until Wayne developed his method practitioners relied on crude approximations for such analyses. Wayne’s paper "Hazard Plotting for Incomplete Failure Data" in the inaugural issue of the J. of Quality technology received the Brumbaugh Award for the ASQ as the 1969 paper that made a great contribution to the development of industrial applications of quality control. Moreover, his paper "Theory and Applications of Hazard Plotting for Censored Failure Data" was reprinted in the 40th Anniversary issue of Technometrics (2000) as one of the "Two Classics in Reliability Theory." Dr. Wayne also developed software that is widely used in reliability analysis; STATPAC is the first complete package for analysis of reliability and accelerated test data, including censored and interval data. It was the first to provide probability plots, confidence limits, maximum likelihood fitting of many models including accelerated life test models, proper analysis of step-stress data, residuals and their analyses, and a simple user interface. Its versatile reliability features stimulated imitations in SPLUS, SAS, JMP, ReliaSoft, WinSmith, and others. Also, POWNOR, a software that fits the power-(log)normal distribution to censored life data on specimens of differing sizes. This was developed on his NSF-NIST-ASA senior research fellowship at NIST to develop better statistical models for electromigration failures of microcircuits.

== Selected publications ==
=== Books ===
- Nelson, Wayne (December 2003). Applied Life Data Analysis. Wiley. ISBN 0471644625.
- Nelson, Wayne (September 2004). Accelerated Testing: Statistical Models, Test Plans, and Data Analysis. Wiley. ISBN 0471697362.
- Nelson, Wayne (January 2002). Recurrent Events Data Analysis for Product Repairs, Disease Recurrences, and Other Applications. Society for Industrial and Applied Mathematics. ISBN 0898715229.

=== Papers ===
- Better Confidence Limits for System Reliability, Nelson W. and Hall B., 2019 Annual Reliability and Maintainability Symposium (RAMS), 2019
- Cost optimal sudden-death life testing, Nelson W., 2017 Annual Reliability and Maintainability Symposium (RAMS), 2017
- Residuals and Their Analyses for Accelerated Life Tests With Step and Varying Stress Nelson W., IEEE Transactions on Reliability, Volume: 57, Issue: 2, IEEE, 2008
- Analysis of repair data Nelson W., 1988. Proceedings Annual Reliability and Maintainability Symposium, 1988
- Optimum Simple Step-Stress Plans for Accelerated Life Testing Nelson W., IEEE Transactions on Reliability, Volume: R-32, Issue: 1, IEEE, 1983
- Analysis of Performance-Degradation Data from Accelerated Tests Nelson W., IEEE Transactions on Reliability, Volume: R-30, Issue: 2, IEEE, 1981
- Prediction Limits for the Last Failure Time of a (Log) Normal Sample from Early Failures Nelson W., IEEE Transactions on Reliability, Volume: R-30, Issue: 5, IEEE, 1981
- Analysis of Accelerated Life Test Data, Nelson W., IEEE Transactions on Electrical Insulation, Volume: EI-7, Issue: 1, Pages: 36 - 55, IEEE, March 1972
- Hazard Plotting for Incomplete Failure Data, Nelson W., Quarterly Journal of Methods, Applications, and Related Topics, Volume 1, 1969 - Issue 1, Journal of Quality Technology, Jan 1969

== Awards ==
- Brumbaugh Award of the American Society for Quality (1969)
- Fulbright Award for research and lecturing (in Spanish) on reliability data analysis (2001)
- 2003 Shewhart Medal of American Society for Quality for his technical leadership
- Lifetime Achievement Award of the IEEE Reliability Society for outstanding developments of reliability methodology and contributions to reliability education. Nelson was the second person to receive this annual award. (2005)
- 2010 Shainin Medals of the American Society for Quality
- 2018 Hahn Award of the American Statistical Association
