= Edward Kaplan =

Edward Kaplan may refer to:

- Edward H. Kaplan, professor of operations research
- Edward L. Kaplan (1920–2006), mathematician
