= Odd Aalen =

Norwegian statistician and professor (born 1947)

- Born: May 6, 1947 (age 79); Oslo, Norway
- Education: University of Oslo; University of California, Berkeley
- Occupations: Statistician; professor
- Scientific career
- Institutions: University of Oslo
- Doctoral advisor: Lucien Le Cam

Odd Olai Aalen (born 6 May 1947, in Oslo) is a Norwegian statistician in the Department of Biostatistics at the Institute of Basic Medical Sciences at the University of Oslo, where he is a professor emeritus. He is the namesake of the Nelson–Aalen estimator and Aalen-Johansen estimator, used in survival analysis, reliability engineering, and life insurance to estimate the cumulative number of expected events.

== Life ==
Aalen completed his examen artium in 1966 at Oslo Cathedral School before studying first mathematics and physics and then statistics in which he graduated at the University of Oslo in 1972. He completed a Ph.D. in 1995 at the University of California, Berkeley, with the dissertation Statistical Inference for a Family of Counting Processes supervised by Lucien Le Cam.

== Honors and awards ==
Aalen is an elected member of the Norwegian Academy of Science and Letters. He was elected as a Fellow of the American Statistical Association in 2007.
