= Exponential-logarithmic distribution =

Family of lifetime distributions with decreasing failure rate

Exponential-Logarithmic distribution (EL)
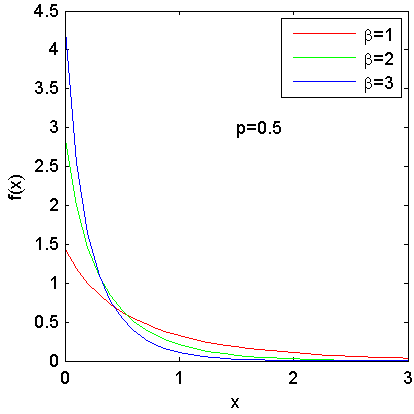
- Probability density function
- Parameters: $p\in (0,1)$ $\beta >0$
- Support: $x\in[0,\infty)$
- PDF: $\frac{1}{-\ln p} \times \frac{\beta(1-p) e^{-\beta x}}{1-(1-p) e^{-\beta x}}$
- CDF: $1-\frac{\ln(1-(1-p) e^{-\beta x})}{\ln p}$
- Mean: $-\frac{\text{polylog}(2,1-p)}{\beta\ln p}$
- Median: $\frac{\ln(1+\sqrt{p})}{\beta}$
- Mode: 0
- Variance: $-\frac{2 \text{polylog}(3,1-p)}{\beta^2\ln p}$ $-\frac{ \text{polylog}^2(2,1-p)}{\beta^2\ln^2 p}$
- MGF: $-\frac{\beta(1-p)}{\ln p (\beta-t)} \text{hypergeom}_{2,1}$ $([1,\frac{\beta-t}{\beta}],[\frac{2\beta-t}{\beta}],1-p)$

In probability theory and statistics, the Exponential-Logarithmic (EL) distribution is a family of lifetime distributions with decreasing failure rate, defined on the interval [0, ∞). This distribution is parameterized by two parameters $p\in(0,1)$ and $\beta >0$.

== Introduction ==
The study of lengths of the lives of organisms, devices, materials, etc., is of major importance in the biological and engineering sciences. In general, the lifetime of a device is expected to exhibit decreasing failure rate (DFR) when its behavior over time is characterized by 'work-hardening' (in engineering terms) or 'immunity' (in biological terms).

The exponential-logarithmic model, together with its various properties, are studied by Tahmasbi and Rezaei (2008). This model is obtained under the concept of population heterogeneity (through the process of compounding).

== Properties of the distribution ==
=== Distribution ===
The probability density function (pdf) of the EL distribution is given by Tahmasbi and Rezaei (2008)

$$f(x; p, \beta) := \left( \frac{1}{-\ln p}\right) \frac{\beta(1-p)e^{-\beta x}}{1-(1-p)e^{-\beta x}}$$

where $p\in (0,1)$ and $\beta >0$. This function is strictly decreasing in $x$ and tends to zero as $x\rightarrow \infty$. The EL distribution has its modal value of the density at x=0, given by

$$\frac{\beta (1-p)}{-p \ln p}$$

The EL reduces to the exponential distribution with rate parameter $\beta$, as $p\rightarrow 1$.

The cumulative distribution function is given by

$$F(x;p,\beta)=1-\frac{\ln(1-(1-p) e^{-\beta x})}{\ln p},$$

and hence, the median is given by

$$x_\text{median}=\frac{\ln(1+\sqrt{p})}{\beta}$$.

=== Moments ===
The moment generating function of $X$ can be determined from the pdf by direct integration and is given by

$$M_X(t) = E(e^{tX}) = -\frac{\beta(1-p)}{\ln p (\beta-t)} F_{2,1}\left(\left[1,\frac{\beta-t}{\beta}\right],\left[\frac{2\beta-t}{\beta}\right],1-p\right),$$

where $F_{2,1}$ is a hypergeometric function. This function is also known as Barnes's extended hypergeometric function. The definition of $F_{N,D}({n,d},z)$ is

$$F_{N,D}(n,d,z):=\sum_{k=0}^\infty \frac{ z^k \prod_{i=1}^p\Gamma(n_i+k)\Gamma^{-1}(n_i)}{\Gamma(k+1)\prod_{i=1}^q\Gamma(d_i+k)\Gamma^{-1}(d_i)}$$

where $n=[n_1, n_2,\dots , n_N]$ and ${d}=[d_1, d_2, \dots , d_D]$.

The moments of $X$ can be derived from $M_X(t)$. For $r\in\mathbb{N}$, the raw moments are given by

$$E(X^r;p,\beta)=-r!\frac{\operatorname{Li}_{r+1}(1-p) }{\beta^r\ln p},$$

where $\operatorname{Li}_a(z)$ is the polylogarithm function which is defined as follows:

$$\operatorname{Li}_a(z) =\sum_{k=1}^{\infty}\frac{z^k}{k^a}.$$

Hence the mean and variance of the EL distribution are given, respectively, by

$$E(X)=-\frac{\operatorname{Li}_2(1-p)}{\beta\ln p},$$

$$\operatorname{Var}(X)=-\frac{2 \operatorname{Li}_3(1-p)}{\beta^2\ln p}-\left(\frac{ \operatorname{Li}_2(1-p)}{\beta\ln p}\right)^2.$$

=== The survival, hazard and mean residual life functions ===
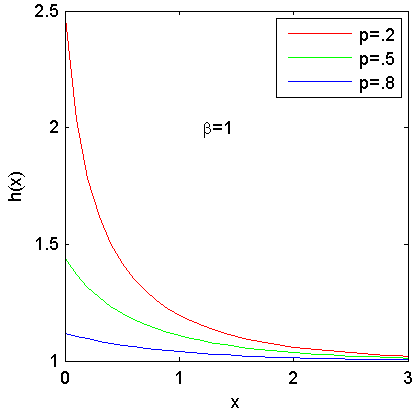
Hazard function

The survival function (also known as the reliability function) and hazard function (also known as the failure rate function) of the EL distribution are given, respectively, by

$$s(x)=\frac{\ln(1-(1-p)e^{-\beta x})}{\ln p},$$

$$h(x)=\frac{-\beta(1-p)e^{-\beta x}}{(1-(1-p)e^{-\beta x})\ln(1-(1-p)e^{-\beta x})}.$$

The mean residual lifetime of the EL distribution is given by

$$m(x_0;p,\beta)=E(X-x_0|X\geq x_0;\beta,p)=-\frac{\operatorname{Li}_2(1-(1-p)e^{-\beta x_0})}{\beta \ln(1-(1-p)e^{-\beta x_0})}$$

where $\operatorname{Li}_2$ is the dilogarithm function

=== Random number generation ===
Let U be a random variate from the standard uniform distribution. Then the following transformation of U has the EL distribution with parameters p and β:

$$X = \frac{1}{\beta}\ln \left(\frac{1-p}{1-p^U}\right).$$

== Estimation of the parameters ==
To estimate the parameters, the EM algorithm is used. This method is discussed by Tahmasbi and Rezaei (2008). The EM iteration is given by

$$\beta^{(h+1)} = n \left( \sum_{i=1}^n\frac{x_i}{1-(1-p^{(h)})e^{-\beta^{(h)}x_i}} \right)^{-1},$$

$$p^{(h+1)}=\frac{-n(1-p^{(h+1)})} { \ln( p^{(h+1)}) \sum_{i=1}^n
\{1-(1-p^{(h)})e^{-\beta^{(h)} x_i}\}^{-1}}.$$

== Related distributions ==
The EL distribution has been generalized to form the Weibull-logarithmic distribution.

If X is defined to be the random variable which is the minimum of N independent realisations from an exponential distribution with rate parameter β, and if N is a realisation from a logarithmic distribution (where the parameter p in the usual parameterisation is replaced by (1 − p)), then X has the exponential-logarithmic distribution in the parameterisation used above.
