= Bayesian survival analysis =

Statistical method

Survival analysis is normally carried out using parametric models, semi-parametric models, non-parametric models to estimate the survival rate in clinical research. However recently Bayesian models are also used to estimate the survival rate due to their ability to handle design and analysis issues in clinical research.
