= Empirical likelihood =

Method of estimating statistical parameters

In probability theory and statistics, empirical likelihood (EL) is a nonparametric method for estimating the parameters of statistical models. It requires fewer assumptions about the error distribution while retaining some of the merits in likelihood-based inference. The estimation method requires that the data are independent and identically distributed (iid). It performs well even when the distribution is asymmetric or censored. EL methods can also handle constraints and prior information on parameters. Art Owen pioneered work in this area with his 1988 paper.

== Definition ==
Given a set of $n$ i.i.d. realizations $y_i$ of random variables $Y_i$, then the empirical distribution function is $\hat{F}(y):=\sum_{i=1}^n \pi_i I(Y_i<y)$, with the indicator function $I$ and the (normalized) weights $\pi_i$. Then, the empirical likelihood is:

$$L:=\prod_{i=1}^n \frac{\hat{F}(y_i)-\hat{F}(y_i-\delta y)}{\delta y},$$

where $\delta y$ is a small number (potentially the difference to the next smaller sample).

Empirical likelihood estimation can be augmented with side information by using further constraints (similar to the generalized estimating equations approach) for the empirical distribution function. E.g. a constraint like the following can be incorporated using a Lagrange multiplier $E[h(Y;\theta)]=\int_{-\infty}^\infty h(y;\theta) dF=0$ which implies $\hat{E}[h(y;\theta)]=\sum_{i=1}^n h(y_i;\theta)\pi_i=0$.

With similar constraints, we could also model correlation.

=== Discrete random variables ===
The empirical-likelihood method can also be also employed for discrete distributions. Given $\ p_{i}:=\hat{F}(y_i)-\hat{F}(y_i-\delta y),\ i = 1,...,n$ such that $p_i \geq 0 \text{ and } \sum_{i=1}^n\ p_{i} =1.$

Then the empirical likelihood is again $L(p_{1},...,p_{n})= \prod_{i=1}^n \ p_{i}$.

Using the Lagrangian multiplier method to maximize the logarithm of the empirical likelihood subject to the trivial normalization constraint, we find $p_i = 1/n$ as a maximum. Therefore, $\hat{F}$ is the empirical distribution function.

== Estimation Procedure ==
EL estimates are calculated by maximizing the empirical likelihood function (see above) subject to constraints based on the estimating function and the trivial assumption that the probability weights of the likelihood function sum to 1. This procedure is represented as:

$$\max_{\pi_{i}, \theta} \ln(L)=
\max_{\pi_{i}, \theta} \sum_{i=1}^n \ln \pi_i$$

subject to the constraints

$s.t. \sum_{i=1}^n\pi_i = 1, \sum_{i=1}^n\pi_i h(y_i;\theta) = 0,\forall i\in[1..n]\quad 0\le\pi_i.$

The value of the theta parameter can be found by solving the Lagrangian function

$\mathcal{L} = \sum_{i=1}^n \ln \pi_{i} + \mu (1- \sum_{i=1}^n \pi_{i})-n\tau' \sum_{i=1}^n \pi_{i} h(y_{i};\theta).$

There is a clear analogy between this maximization problem and the one solved for maximum entropy.

The parameters $\pi_i$ are nuisance parameters.

== Empirical Likelihood Ratio (ELR) ==
An empirical likelihood ratio function is defined and used to obtain confidence intervals parameter of interest θ similar to parametric likelihood ratio confidence intervals. Let L(F) be the empirical likelihood of function $F$, then the ELR would be:

$R(F)=L(F)/L(F_{n})$.

Consider sets of the form

$C = \{ T(F)| R(F) \geq r \}$.

Under such conditions a test of $T(F)=t$ rejects when t does not belong to $C$, that is, when no distribution F with $T(F)=t$ has likelihood $L(F) \geq rL(F_{n})$.

The central result is for the mean of X. Clearly, some restrictions on $F$ are needed, or else $C = \reals^p$ whenever $r < 1$. To see this, let:

$F = \epsilon \delta_{x} + (1- \epsilon) F_{n}$

If $\epsilon$ is small enough and $\epsilon >0$, then $R(F) \geq r$.

But then, as $x$ ranges through $\reals^p$, so does the mean of $F$, tracing out $C = \reals^p$. The problem can be solved by restricting to distributions F that are supported in a bounded set. It turns out to be possible to restrict attention t distributions with support in the sample, in other words, to distribution $F \ll F_{n}$. Such method is convenient since the statistician might not be willing to specify a bounded support for $F$, and since $t$ converts the construction of $C$ into a finite dimensional problem.

== Other Applications ==
The use of empirical likelihood is not limited to confidence intervals. In efficient quantile regression, an EL-based categorization procedure helps determine the shape of the true discrete distribution at level p, and also provides a way of formulating a consistent estimator. In addition, EL can be used in place of parametric likelihood to form model selection criteria. Empirical likelihood can naturally be applied in survival analysis or regression problems

== See also ==
- Bootstrapping (statistics)
- Jackknife (statistics)
- Nelson–Aalen estimator
- Survival_analysis#Discrete-time_survival_models

== Literature ==
- Nordman, Daniel J., and Soumendra N. Lahiri. "A review of empirical likelihood methods for time series." Journal of Statistical Planning and Inference 155 (2014): 1-18. https://doi.org/10.1016/j.jspi.2013.10.001
