= Statistics in Medicine (journal) =

- Discipline: Medical statistics
- Language: English
- Edited by: Paul Albert, Rebecca Betensky, Nigel Stallard, Ben van Calster, X. Joan Hu

Publication details
- History: 1982–present
- Publisher: Wiley
- Frequency: 30/year
- Impact factor: 2.1 (2025)

Standard abbreviations
- ISO 4: Stat. Med.

Indexing
- ISSN: 0277-6715 (print); 1097-0258 (web)
- LCCN: 83641887

Links
- Journal homepage

Statistics in Medicine is a peer-reviewed statistics journal published by Wiley. Established in 1982, the journal publishes articles on medical statistics. The journal is indexed by Mathematical Reviews and SCOPUS. According to the Journal Citation Reports, the journal has a 2025 impact factor of 2.1.
