= Edward L. Kaplan =

American mathematician

Edward Lynn Kaplan
- Born: May 11, 1920; Philadelphia, Pennsylvania
- Died: September 26, 2006 (aged 86); Corvallis, Oregon, U.S.
- Citizenship: American
- Education: Carnegie Institute of Technology; Princeton
- Known for: Kaplan–Meier survival curve
- Spouses: Fances Berting; Mae Nichol-Kaplan
- Scientific career
- Workplaces: US Naval Ordance Laboratory; Bell Telephone Laboratories; Lawrence Radiation Laboratory; Oregon State University
- Thesis: Infinite Permutations of Stationary Random Sequences (1950)
- Doctoral advisor: John W. Tukey; Samuel S. Wilks

Edward Lynn Kaplan (May 11, 1920 – September 26, 2006) was a mathematician most famous for the Kaplan–Meier estimator, developed together with Paul Meier.

== Biography ==
Edward Lynn Kaplan was born in Philadelphia, Pennsylvania, on May 11, 1920. His parents were Eugene V. Kaplan (1887–1977) and Frances Rhodes Kaplan (1891–1978). He graduated from Swissvale High School in Swissvale, Pennsylvania, in 1937. He attended the Carnegie Institute of Technology from 1937 to 1941 and graduated with a bachelor's degree in mathematics in 1941. Three times—in 1939, 1940, and 1941—he was one of the five honorees in the nationwide William Lowell Putnam Mathematical Competition conducted by the American Mathematical Association. He was offered Westinghouse's Putnam Prize Scholar Scholarship in mathematics at Harvard but was unable to accept due to his involvement in war efforts. Kaplan was elected to three scholastic societies: Phi Kappa Phi, Sigma Xi, and the engineering society, Tau Beta Phi.

From June 1941 to August 1948, Kaplan worked at the United States Naval Ordinance Laboratory, Whiteoak, Maryland. His department chief during this time was John V. Atanosoff, the inventor of the first electronic computer. After the war, he matriculated in the PhD program in Princeton's mathematics department along with future Nobel Laureate, John Nash, Jr. Kaplan and Nash had had the same mathematics tutor while at Carnegie, Professor Joseph B. Rosenbach. Kaplan finished his PhD dissertation, "Infinite permutations of stationary random sequences" in November, 1950. His dissertation committee included Professors John W. Tukey and Samuel S. Wilks.

From 1950 to 1957, Kaplan worked for Bell Telephone Laboratories in Murray Hill, NJ. In 1957, he went to the Computation Division of the Lawrence Radiation Laboratory, Livermore, CA, where he worked on the Monte Carlo simulations attendant to the development of the hydrogen bomb. In the fall of 1961 Kaplan joined the mathematics department of Oregon State University in Corvallis, Oregon, where he spent the remainder of his career. He died in Corvallis on September 20, 2006, at the age of 86 after a prolonged debilitating illness.

== Bibliography ==
- 1950: "Multiple elliptic integrals", Journal of Mathematical Physics, 29: 69–75.
- 1952: "Tensor notation and sampling cumulants of K-statistics", Biometrika, 39 (3-4): 319–323.
- 1952: "Numerical integration near a singularity", Journal of Mathematical Physics, 31: 1-28.
- 1955: "Transformation of stationary random sequences," Mathematica Scandinavica, 3: 127–149.
- 1955: "Signal-detection studies, with applications", Bell System Technical Journal, 34 (2): 127–149.
- 1958: "Monte Carlo methods", Proceedings of the Fifth Annual High-Speed Computer Conference, Louisiana State University, Baton Rouge
- 1982: Mathematical Programming and Games, volume I, New York: John Wiley and Sons, 588 pages
