= Contemporary Clinical Trials =

- Discipline: Clinical trials
- Language: English
- Edited by: Howard Sesso, ScD, MPH

Publication details
- Former name: Controlled Clinical Trials
- History: 1980–present
- Publisher: Elsevier
- Frequency: Monthly
- Impact factor: 2.2 (2022)

Standard abbreviations
- ISO 4: Contemp. Clin. Trials

Indexing
- CODEN: CCLTDH
- ISSN: 1551-7144 (print); 1559-2030 (web)
- LCCN: 80645055
- OCLC no.: 56090329

Links
- Journal homepage; Online access; Online access to Controlled Clinical Trials

Contemporary Clinical Trials is a monthly peer-reviewed medical journal covering clinical trials and research design in clinical medicine. It was established in 2005 and is published by Elsevier. The editor-in-chief is JoAnn E. Manson. it was established in 1980 as Controlled Clinical Trials and obtained its current title in 2005.

According to the Journal Citation Reports, the journal has a 2020 impact factor of 2.226.
