= Lost to follow-up =

Subject of a cohort study whose outcome is not traced

In the clinical research trial industry, lost to follow-up refers to patients who at one point in time were actively participating in a clinical research trial, but have become lost (either by error in a computer tracking system or by being unreachable) at the point of follow-up in the trial. These patients can become lost for many reasons. Without properly informing the investigator associated with the clinical trial, they may have opted to withdraw from the clinical trial, moved away from the particular study site during the clinical trial, become ill and unable to communicate, are missing or are deceased.

== Adverse effects ==
Patients who become lost to follow-up during a clinical research trial result in many negative effects on the outcome of the trial and on the pharmaceutical company sponsoring the clinical research trial. Patients who are lost-to-follow-up lead to incomplete study results, which in turn can put a bias on the result of the study as well as a bias on the investigational study medication. A lack of complete results leads to intensified FDA scrutiny of the particular study drug, as well as the pharmaceutical company sponsoring the clinical research study. Biased study outcomes also lead to issues of HIPAA standards and compliance.

Aside from partial study data and regulatory issues, patients that are not retained due to being lost-to-follow-up can lead to problems with the progression of any clinical research study. Low rates of retention and high rates of patients lost-to-follow-up have many side-effects, including longer clinical research trial periods and more monetary expenditures because extra resources may need to be dedicated to the recruitment efforts.

== Solutions ==
There are no standards or guidelines that express the process or methods that can be used to attempt to reach patients who have become lost to follow-up. Institutions such as the FDA have taken action over the recovery of or communication with patients lost-to-follow-up. Section 4.3.4 of the ICH E-6 Good Clinical Practice: Consolidated Guidance reads

"Although a subject is not obliged to give his/her reason(s) for withdrawing prematurely from a trial, the investigator should make a reasonable effort to ascertain the reason(s), while fully respecting the subject's rights."
