= Calvin Zippin =

Cancer epidemiologist and biostatistician

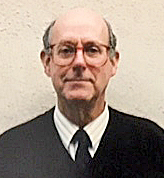
- Born: Calvin (Kalman) Zippin; July 17, 1926 (age 100); Albany, New York
- Education: State University New York at Albany; Johns Hopkins University
- Known for: Zippin estimator Cancer Registries; Cancer epidemiology Surveillance, Epidemiology, and End Results (SEER) program of the National Cancer Institute (NCI)
- Spouse: Patricia Jayne Schubert (1930 – 2015) m. February 9, 1964
- Children: David Benjamin Zippin; Jennifer Dorothy (Zippin) Kontzer
- Awards: 1969 Distinguished Alumnus Award, State University New York at Albany; 1980 Fellow American Statistical Association; 2003 National Cancer Institute Lifetime Achievement and Leadership Award
- Scientific career
- Fields: Biostatistics; Epidemiology; Cancer Registry
- Workplaces: UCSF School of Medicine, Johns Hopkins University
- Thesis: An Evaluation of the Removal Method of Estimating Animal Populations (1953)
- Doctoral advisor: William G. Cochran

Calvin Zippin (born July 17, 1926) is a cancer epidemiologist and biostatistician, and Professor Emeritus in the Department of Epidemiology and Biostatistics at the University of California School of Medicine in San Francisco (UCSF). He is a Fellow of the American Statistical Association, the American College of Epidemiology and the Royal Statistical Society of Great Britain. His doctoral thesis was the basis for the Zippin Estimator, a procedure for estimating wildlife populations using data from trapping experiments. He was a principal investigator in the Surveillance, Epidemiology, and End Results (SEER) program of the National Cancer Institute (NCI) which assesses the magnitude and nature of the cancer problem in the United States. In 1961, he created training programs for cancer registry personnel, which he conducted nationally and internationally. He carried out research on the epidemiology and rules for staging of various cancers. He received a Lifetime Achievement and Leadership Award from the NCI in 2003.

== Early life and education ==
Zippin was born on July 17, 1926, in Albany, New York, United States, the son of Samuel and Jennie (Perkel) Zippin. He received an AB degree magna cum laude in biology and mathematics, from the State University of New York at Albany in 1947. He was a research assistant at the Sterling-Winthrop Research Institute in Rensselaer, New York beginning in 1947. He was awarded a Doctor of Science degree in Biostatistics by the Johns Hopkins School of Hygiene and Public Health in Baltimore, Maryland in 1953.

His thesis advisor was William G. Cochran a statistician known for Cochran's theorem, Cochran-Mantel-Haenzel Test and author of standard biostatistical texts: “Experimental Designs” and “Sampling Techniques”. Zippin's doctoral thesis, An Evaluation of the Removal Method of Estimating Animal Populations became the basis for the Zippin Estimator, and has been used for estimating populations of a wide variety of animal species. It is considered among the easiest and most accurate methods for estimating animal populations in the wild.

== Career ==
At the Sterling-Winthrop Research Institute, Zippin performed various laboratory and statistical duties under Lloyd C. Miller, Ph.D., later Director of Revision (1950-1970) of the United States Pharmacopoeia. Dr. Miller encouraged Zippin to pursue a career in statistics which led to his graduate work at Johns Hopkins where he also held an appointment as a Research Assistant in Biostatistics from 1950 to 1953. Following graduate school, Zippin became an instructor in biostatistics (1953-1955) at the School of Public Health, University of California, Berkeley. He moved to the School of Medicine at the University of California, San Francisco where, at the level of assistant professor, he held appointments in the Cancer Research Institute and the Department of Preventive Medicine. With further advancement, in 1967 he became Professor of Epidemiology in the Cancer Research Institute, Department of Epidemiology and Biostatistics, and Department of Pathology. Since 1991 he has been Professor Emeritus.

Zippin was a Visiting associate professor of statistics, Stanford University, Palo Alto, CA (1962); National Institutes of Health (NIH) Special Postdoctoral Fellow, London School of Hygiene and Tropical Medicine (1964-1965); Visiting Research Worker, Middlesex Hospital Medical School, London (1975); Research Advisor, Assaf Harofeh Medical Center, Zerifin, Israel (1976-2010); Faculty Advisor, Regional Cancer Centre, Trivandrum, Kerala State, India (1984-1991).

== Research ==
Zippin's doctoral thesis became the basis for the Zippin Estimator, a mathematical procedure for estimating wildlife population size based on capture and removal of sequentially trapped animal samples. The method was explored by P. A. P. Moran (1951) and its properties elaborated by Zippin in 1956 and 1958.

Zippin has done extensive research on cancer staging, particularly cancer of the breast and colon-rectum with the American Joint Committee on Cancer and the International Union Against Cancer. He has published on the epidemiology of breast, uterine, and nasopharyngeal cancer, late effects of radiation, and survival patterns in acute lymphocytic and chronic lymphocytic leukemia. His 1960 and 1966 JNCI breast cancer staging articles were included in the "Yearbook of Cancer" compendium of the most influential cancer publications for those years, respectively.

Zippin collaborated with Peter Armitage, extending a mathematical model assuming survival time of cancer patients to follow an exponential distribution whose key parameter (expected survival time) is linearly related to a measure of the severity (e.g., white blood count in leukemia) of disease. The extension provided for the common situation where some patients were still alive and their limited (censored) survival information could be used in estimating the value of the desired parameter.

From 1973 to 1995, Zippin collaborated with Dr. Yoav Horn comparing characteristics of Arab cancer patients living on the West Bank, their disease and survival with those of patients in Israel and the United States. This project documented the need for improved treatment facilities and the training of oncologists in that region. Horn, an Israeli oncologist, started two cancer clinics in Nablus and Beit Jala and developed a training program for Arab oncologists for which Dr. Horn received the Sasakawa Health Prize from the World Health Organization in 2000.

== Honors and awards ==
Zippin is a Fellow of the American Statistical Association (1980), American College of Epidemiology (1982), and the Royal Statistical Society of Great Britain (1965). He was President of the Western North American Region of the International Biometric Society (1979-1980) and a member of the Committee of Presidents of Statistical Societies (1979-1981). He is a member of Phi Beta Kappa, Sigma Xi, Delta Omega (honorary public health society), and Signum Laudis (honorary academic society). In 1994, he was elected an honorary Member of the International Association of Cancer Registries, which is administered by the World Health Organization, and the California Cancer Registrars Association. From 1989 to 1995, he served on the Board of Governors of the National Cancer Database (NCDB), a clinical oncology database sourced from hospital registry data which is jointly sponsored by the American College of Surgeons and the American Cancer Society. Zippin was on the editorial boards of Statistics in Medicine and the Journal of Soviet Oncology. He received the Distinguished Alumnus Award from the State University of New York at Albany (1969) and a Lifetime Achievement and Leadership Award from the National Cancer Institute (2003). Dr. Zippin appeared on the cover of the journal “Cancer Research” in recognition of his contributions to the NCI's SEER (Surveillance, Epidemiology, and End Results ) program.
