= American Joint Committee on Cancer =

Organization standardising cancer staging

The American Joint Committee on Cancer (AJCC) is an organization best known for defining and popularizing cancer staging standards, officially the AJCC staging system. This committee was established in 1959 to formulate and publish systems of classification of cancer, including staging and end results reporting, which will be acceptable to and used by the medical profession for selecting the most effective treatment, determining prognosis, and continuing evaluation of cancer control measures.

== Membership ==
The AJCC has 20 member organizations. Membership is reserved for those organizations whose missions or goals are consistent with or complementary to those of the AJCC. These organizations generally demonstrate involvement or activity in one or more of the following areas: cancer epidemiology, patient care, cancer control, cancer registration, professional education, research, or biostatistics.

These organizations include:

- American Association of Pathologists' Assistants
- American Cancer Society
- American College of Physicians
- American College of Radiology
- American College of Surgeons
- American Head and Neck Society
- American Society for Radiation Oncology
- American Society of Clinical Oncology
- American Society of Colon and Rectal Surgeons
- American Urological Association
- Canadian Partnership Against Cancer
- Centers for Disease Control and Prevention
- College of American Pathologists
- International Collaboration on Cancer Reporting
- National Cancer Institute
- National Cancer Registrars Association
- National Comprehensive Cancer Network
- North American Association of Central Cancer Registries
- Society of Gynecologic Oncology
- Society of Surgical Oncology
- Society of Urologic Oncology

== Objectives ==
The objectives of the AJCC are to:

1. Facilitate a timely and rigorous, evidence-based process to support a biologically relevant system for classification and outcome prediction of cancer that is compatible with systems of cancer population surveillance.
2. Proactively educate the oncology community through the development and delivery of effective programs and products to guide patient care.
3. Promulgate research and serve as the clearinghouse to support the development of clinically relevant predictive tools, prognostic factors, and other indicators that classify and predict cancer.
4. Foster collaborative relationships with AJCC member organizations and organizations with similar objectives in support of systems to diagnose and treat cancer.
5. Support and be responsive to public and private efforts to improve care and predict outcomes for cancer patients.
