= Zauber =

Zauber is a surname, and a German language word for magic. It is the surname of:

- Angelika Zauber (born 1958), German runner
- Ann Zauber, American biostatistician
- Samuel Zauber (1901–1986), Romanian association football player

== See also ==
- Leni Zauber, alias of fictional comic character Mystique
- Zauber, final boss in 1998 video game Destrega
- Die Zauberflöte (The Magic Flute), opera by Mozart
