= Helen Abbey =

American biostatistician

- Born: September 1, 1915
- Died: March 4, 2001 (aged 85)
- Education: Battle Creek College; University of Michigan; Johns Hopkins University
- Scientific career
- Fields: Biostatistics
- Thesis: An Examination of the Reed-Frost Theory of Epidemics
- Doctoral advisor: William Gemmell Cochran
- Notable students: Victor A. McKusick; Alfred Sommer; Ann Zauber

Helen Abbey (September 1, 1915 – March 4, 2001) was an American biostatistician known for her research on the health effects of radiation and on infections among Native Americans, and for her prolific mentoring of students in statistics. She was affiliated with Johns Hopkins University for over 50 years.

== Education and career ==
Abbey graduated from Battle Creek College (now Andrews University) in 1940, and earned a master's degree in mathematics in 1942 at the University of Michigan. She became a faculty member at the Johns Hopkins School of Public Health in 1946 and, while there, completed a doctorate in biostatistics in 1951.

At Johns Hopkins, she became affiliated with the departments of biostatistics, epidemiology, population and family health sciences, medicine, and ophthalmology. She retired in 1999.

== Contributions ==
The topics of her own research included the effects of low-level radiation on cataracts, skin cancer, and other health issues, and the history of food-borne diseases among Native American populations. One of Abbey's studies, a 1952 work on infectious diseases, has been called "the classic study" of the Reed–Frost model in small communities.

=== Former students ===
Abbey taught over 4000 students at Johns Hopkins and was the mentor to over 700 graduate theses and dissertations. The story went that "if you parachuted anywhere on earth, you would land within 50 miles of a former student" of hers.

Former students of her include the following:

- Victor A. McKusick
- Alfred Sommer
- Ann Zauber

== Recognition ==
Abbey became a Fellow of the American Statistical Association in 1976. She was also a winner of the American Public Health Association Award.

The Helen Abbey and Margaret Merrell Professorship in Biostatistics Education at Johns Hopkins University is named after her and Professor Margaret Merrell. Part of the initial funding for the position was funded by her estate after she died.

== See also ==
- Margaret Merrell
