= John Sisterson =

Personal information
- Full name: John Sisterson
- Place of birth: England

Managerial career
- Years: Team
- 2003–2005: West Texas A&M Buffaloes (men's & women's asst.)
- 2003–2009: United States deaf women
- 2005–2022: Santa Barbara Vaqueros (women's)
- 2007–: Santa Barbara Vaqueros

John Sisterson is an American collegiate soccer head coach, currently with Santa Barbara City College as head coach of men's team. He has been with the Vaqueros since 2005 and is the most successful soccer coach in the history of Santa Barbara City College, with over 400 wins for both men's and women's teams. Sisterson has won 10 Western State Championships, as well as receiving coach of the year awards on 10 occasions. In 2011 both the men's and women's teams were Western State Conference Champions, the only time this has been achieved by one college in the history of the Western State Conference, and this was also repeated in 2017, Sisterson being head coach of both teams. His players both male and female have moved on to play professionally, and have also been inducted in the Women's Professional Soccer League Hall of Fame. Sisterson was also the head coach for the United States Deaflympics Women's soccer team from 2003 - 2009. In 2005 the team won the gold medal at the Deaflympics in the Olympic Stadium, Melbourne, Australia, beating Russia in the final 3–0.

== Coaching career ==
Upson Lee

Sisterson's first U.S. head coaching job came in 1998, when he was appointed to the position at Upson Lee, in Georgia. He took a losing program, that had never had a winning year, to six consecutive winning seasons, a region championship, and five runners-up berths. He was Coach of the Year on four occasions, and had a record of 74–24–4. He was also director of soccer for the Upson Lee Soccer Association.

U.S. Olympic Federation

Sisterson was hired as women's head soccer coach for the U.S. Deaf Soccer Association in 2003. The team previously had poor results in worldwide tournaments. The goal was to prepare and qualify a team for the 2005 Deaflympics in Melbourne, Australia. Sisterson recruited his new squad throughout the U.S., getting mainly NCAA D1 players. Holding training camps in Atlanta, Los Angeles, Salt Lake City and New York, Sisterson delivered immediate results. The team was unbeaten in pre-Olympic games against NCAA university teams, and qualified for the Deaflympics as favorites. Sisterson's team remained undefeated throughout Olympic competition (7–0), beating Great Britain in the quarter-final, Denmark in the semi-final, culminating in the defeat of Russia in the gold medal game, at the Olympic Stadium in Melbourne. Sisterson signed a new contract to lead the team to the 2009 Deaflympics in Chinese Taipei, upon returning from Australia. He selected and trained the squad until 2009, but due to head coaching commitments at Santa Barbara City College, could not attend the Olympics. His assistant, and longtime friend, Ken McDonald, led the team, again unbeaten, to win the gold medal.

W Texas A&M University

Sisterson became head assistant at W Texas A&M University in 2004. He coached both the men's and women's programs, and was the recruiting coordinator. The women's team were NCAA Region Tournament finalists, losing to the eventual national champions. The women's team had a record of 13–6–1, and the men's team, who were also tournament finalists, had a record of 11–7–2. Sisterson resigned as head assistant, to accept a head coaching position in Santa Barbara, California.

Santa Barbara City College

Sisterson was hired as head women's soccer coach in 2005. In 2008, he was also appointed as the head men's soccer coach, by athletic director, Mike Warren. Sisterson led the Vaquero women's team to Western State Conference (WSC) championships in 2011, 2014, 2017, 2018, 2019 and 2022. In 2017 both the men and women's teams were unbeaten in regular season. In 2014, the team was unbeaten in conference. This was the first time this had been achieved in the program's history. Prior to Sisterson, the women's team had never won a conference title and was nationally unranked. Under Sisterson's guidance, the women's team has achieved numerous national rankings, as high as 2nd in 2017, 5th in 2008 and 2011 and 6th in 2016. He has also led the team to 14 out of 15 post-season tournament appearances, and has a record of 203-68-51 since 2005. The Vaquero women have been honored with five of the last six Western State Conference Player of the Year awards. His success with the Vaqueros men's team includes winning the Western State Conference championship on four occasions. The men's team were also Final Four participants in 2011 and the Women's team in 2016 and 2017 and in 2017 were State Runners Up. Under Sisterson's tutelage, the team has produced four Western State Conference Player of the Year recipients. The Vaquero men's team are the all-time winningest in the Western State Conference, and Sisterson has won four WSC titles with a 160-70-48 record. Since 2006, he has achieved a first or second-place position in the WSC, with one of his teams. In 2011, Sisterson's teams were both Western State Conference champions, the only time in WSC history that this has been achieved by one college and this was repeated in 2017. He has won over 400 games with both the men's and women's teams, and is the only soccer coach to have achieved this milestone at Santa Barbara City College. While at Santa Barbara Sisterson has been honored with ten Coach of the Year awards, including an NSCAA West Region Coach of the Year award, CCCSCA Southern Region Coach of the Year, 7 Western State Conference Coach of the Year awards and a Santa Barbara Round Table College Coach of the Year. His players have achieved All American awards, and have gone on to play professionally, as well as on national teams.

== Honors ==
=== Upson Lee ===
Winner

- Region Championship
- Coach of The Year (4)

Runner-up

- Region Championship (4)

=== US Olympic Federation ===
Winner

- Olympic Gold Medal - 2005 Deaflympics Melbourne Australia, Women's Soccer

=== Santa Barbara City College ===
Winner

- Western State Conference Championship (10) 2022, 2019, 2018, 2017, 2017, 2014, 2011, 2011, 2009, 2008
- Western State Conference Coach of the Year (6) 2018, 2017, 2014, 2011, 2011, 2008
- NSCAA West Region Coach of the Year
- Southern California Coach of the Year
- Santa Barbara Athletic Round Table College Coach of the Year

Runner-up

- Western State Conference (5)

== Statistics ==
=== As a manager in the USA since 1998 ===
Team	From	To	Record			
Team	From	To	G	W	L	D
Upson Lee	1998	2003	102	74	24	4
US Olympic Deaf Team	2003	2009	14	14	0	0
Santa Barbara City College	2005	2022	689	407	159	123
Career			805	495	183	127
