= Jane Newburger =

American paediatrician (born 1949)

Jane Wimpfheimer Newburger
- Born: 1949 (age 76–77); Boston
- Education: Bryn Mawr College; Harvard T.H. Chan School of Public Health; Harvard Medical School
- Scientific career
- Workplaces: Boston Children's Hospital

Jane Wimpfheimer Newburger is an American pediatrician who is Commonwealth Professor of Pediatrics at Harvard Medical School and Associate Cardiologist-in-Chief at the Boston Children's Hospital. Her research has considered the fundamental mechanisms that underpin Kawasaki disease and the outcomes of children suffering from congenital heart defects. She was elected Fellow of the National Academy of Medicine in 2021.

== Early life and education ==
Newburger was born in New York City. She was raised in the Bronx and moved to Yonkers, New York at the age of six. She decided that she wanted to become a doctor at a young age. She was an undergraduate student at Bryn Mawr College, where she majored in chemistry. She moved to the Harvard Medical School as a medical student and graduated in 1974. She was an intern in pediatrics and the Boston Children's Hospital, where she also completed her residency and fellowship. She was awarded a Masters of Public Health from the Harvard T.H. Chan School of Public Health in 1980.

== Research and career ==
Newburger's research has explored heart diseases in children, with a particular focus on Kawasaki disease. Kawasaki disease develops after birth and creates inflammation in blood vessels, and Newburger has studied it since the early 1980s. At the time there was no established therapy. In an effort to improve its diagnosis and treatment, she has considered the epidemiology and long-term effects of the condition on children. Intravenous immune globulin therapy emerged as a treatment in Japan, which resulted in the formation of a multi-centre research group in the United States. The members include David Bellinger, Annette Baker and Mary Beth Son.

Newburger secured funding from the National Institutes of Health to run a trial of IVIG, showing that it was a highly effective therapy for most children who suffer from the disease. She worked with the American Heart Association to create guidelines to improve IVIG treatment of patients with incomplete Kawasaki disease. Early diagnosis of Kawasaki disease prevents the condition becoming life-threatening, as it can cause aneurysms in the coronary arteries. Children who suffer from it can develop atherosclerosis. It is unclear what causes Kawasaki disease, but it has been reported to be more common in children of Asian descent. Japan and South Korea have the highest incidences of Kawasaki disease in the world.

Newburger has focused on improving the healthcare outcomes of children suffering from congenital heart defects. Such defects occur in around 8 of every 1,000 live births. To treat these defects, the heart is temporarily stopped during surgery, which results in restricted blood supply to the brain. These defects can give rise to neurocognitive challenges such as learning disorders. In recognition of her contributions to cardiology, Newburger is a Fellow of the American Heart Association (FAHA). In 2007, she was awarded the Distinguished Scientist Award of the American College of Cardiology, and in 2009 the Young Hearts Meritorious Achievement Award. She was made the Commonwealth Professor of Paediatrics in 2008.

Newburger has served as Chair of the American Heart Association Committee on Rheumatic Fever. Newburger was elected Fellow of the National Academy of Medicine in 2021. In 2024 the American Heart Association recognized her contributions to the field with both the Distinguished Scientist Award and the Eugene Braunwald Academic Mentorship Award.

== Selected publications ==
- Newburger, Jane; Masato Takahashi; Michael A Gerber; et al. (2004). "Diagnosis, treatment, and long-term management of Kawasaki disease: a statement for health professionals from the Committee on Rheumatic Fever, Endocarditis and Kawasaki Disease, Council on Cardiovascular Disease in the Young, American Heart Association". Circulation. 110 (17): 2747–71. doi:10.1161/01.cir.0000145143.19711.78. PMID 15505111. Wikidata Q28171298.
- Newburger, Jane; Masato Takahashi; Jane C. Burns; et al. (1986). "The treatment of Kawasaki syndrome with intravenous gamma globulin". The New England Journal of Medicine. 315 (6): 341–347. doi:10.1056/nejm198608073150601. PMID 2426590. Wikidata Q58478448.
- Newburger, Jane; M. Takahashi; A. S. Beiser; J. C. Burns; J. Bastian; K. J. Chung; Colan, Steven; C. E. Duffy; D. R. Fulton; M. P. Glode (1991). "A single intravenous infusion of gamma globulin as compared with four infusions in the treatment of acute Kawasaki syndrome". The New England Journal of Medicine. 324 (23): 1633–1639. doi:10.1056/nejm199106063242305. PMID 1709446. Wikidata Q34580488.
