= Alexa Beiser =

American biostatistician

Alexa S. Beiser
- Education: University of California
- Known for: Biostatistics
- Scientific career
- Workplaces: Boston University

Alexa S. Beiser is an American professor of biostatistics and public health researcher.

== Biography ==
Beiser did her PhD in mathematics at Boston University, following her M.A. at the University of California, San Diego in Applied Mathematics and B.A. in Biology and Psychology from the University of California, Santa Cruz.

She has worked at the Boston University School of Public Health since 1985, currently in the Framingham Heart Study (FHS) neurology group. Beiser co-developed the biostatistics doctoral program at Boston University.

== Research ==
She has worked on areas such as risk factors for dementia, how stress affects memory, and how physical activity can improve health for people with diabetes. She currently leads the FHS neurology group data management team, with a focus of analysing data relating to dementia.

== Selected papers ==
- Plasma Homocysteine as a Risk Factor for Dementia and Alzheimer's Disease, N Engl J Med 2002; 346:476-483, doi:10.1056/NEJMoa011613
- Lifetime Risk for Development of Atrial Fibrillation, Circulation. 2004;110:1042–1046, doi:10.1161/01.CIR.0000140263.20897.42
- Residual Lifetime Risk for Developing Hypertension in Middle-aged Women and Men, JAMA. 2002;287(8):1003-1010, doi:10.1001/jama.287.8.1003

== Books co-authored ==
- Introductory Applied Biostatistics, Ralph B. D'Agostino Sr., Lisa M. Sullivan, Alexa Beiser, ISBN 9780534423995
