= Margaret Merrell =

American biostatistician

Margaret Merrell (December 3, 1900 – 21, 1995) was an American biostatistician who taught at Johns Hopkins University for many years and became the first female full professor in the Johns Hopkins School of Public Health. She is known for her research with Lowell Reed on the construction of life tables. She also observed that, for longitudinal data on individuals, fitting a curve to each individual and then averaging the parameters describing the curve will typically give different results than averaging the data values of the individuals and fitting a single curve to the averaged data.

== Biography ==
Merrell was born in La Grange, Illinois. She entered Wellesley College as an honor student from Framingham High School, and became vice-president of the Wellesley mathematics club. She graduated in 1922, and took a position as a schoolteacher in Baltimore. She joined Johns Hopkins as an instructor and graduate student in 1925, and completed her Sc.D. there in 1930. Her dissertation, supervised by Lowell Reed, was The Relationship of Individual Growth to Average Growth.

After completing her doctorate, Merrell remained on the Johns Hopkins faculty. During World War II, she consulted with the U.S. Army on treatments for sexually transmitted diseases and for motion sickness. As a faculty member at Johns Hopkins, she "reportedly carried most of her department's teaching load" and was described as "the intellectual power behind the throne" of the department. She was promoted to full professor in 1957, served as acting chair of biostatistics in 1957–1958, and retired in 1959.

She died in 1995, in a nursing home in Berlin, New Hampshire.

== Honors and awards ==
Merrell was honored by the American Statistical Association in 1951 by election as a fellow of the association.

The Helen Abbey and Margaret Merrell Professorship in Biostatistics Education at Johns Hopkins University is named after her and Professor Helen Abbey.

== See also ==
- Helen Abbey
