= William Gemmell Cochran =

British-American statistician

William G. Cochran
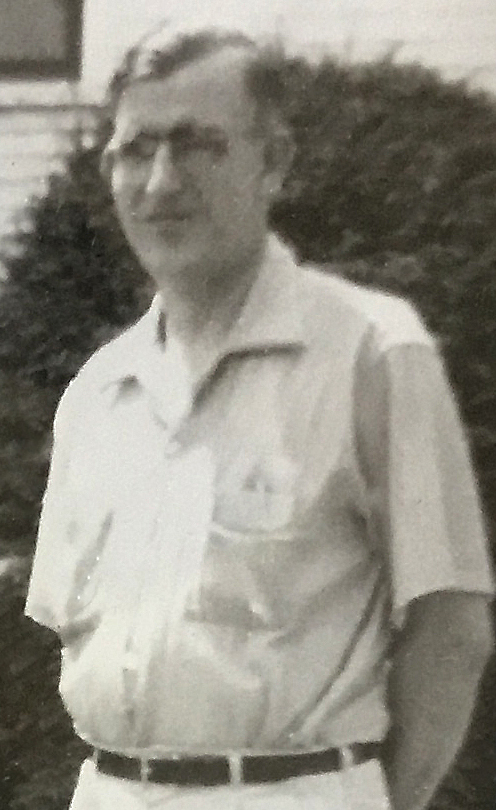
- Cochran in 1952
- Born: July 15, 1909; Rutherglen, South Lanarkshire, Scotland
- Died: March 29, 1980 (aged 70); Orleans, Massachusetts
- Education: University of Glasgow; University of Cambridge
- Known for: Cochran's C test; Cochran's Q test; Cochran's theorem; Cochran–Mantel–Haenszel statistics
- Scientific career
- Fields: Statistics
- Institutions: Rothamsted Experimental Station; Iowa State University; North Carolina State University; Johns Hopkins University; Harvard University
- Academic advisors: John Wishart
- Doctoral students: Helen Abbey; T. A. Bancroft; Ralph B. D'Agostino; Donald Rubin; Calvin Zippin; Walter T. Federer

William Gemmell Cochran (15 July 1909 – 29 March 1980) was a prominent statistician. He was born in Scotland but spent most of his life in the United States.

Cochran studied mathematics at the University of Glasgow and the University of Cambridge. He worked at Rothamsted Experimental Station from 1934 to 1939, when he moved to the United States. There he helped establish several departments of statistics. His longest spell in any one university was at Harvard, which he joined in 1957 and from which he retired in 1976.

== Writings ==
Cochran wrote many articles and books. His books became standard texts:

- Experimental Designs (with Gertrude Mary Cox) 1950 ISBN 0-471-54567-8
- Cochran, William G. (1977). Sampling Techniques (Third ed.). Wiley. ISBN 0-471-16240-X.
- Statistical Methods Applied to Experiments in Agriculture and Biology by George W. Snedecor (Cochran contributed from the fifth (1956) edition) ISBN 0-8138-1561-4
- Planning and Analysis of Observational Studies (edited by Lincoln E. Moses and Frederick Mosteller) 1983.
