= Cancer registry =

Collection of data about cancer and tumor diseases

A cancer registry is a systematic collection of data about cancer and tumor diseases. The data are collected by Cancer Registrars. Cancer Registrars capture a complete summary of patient history, diagnosis, treatment, and status for every cancer patient in the United States, and other countries.

The Surveillance, Epidemiology and End Results (SEER) program of the National Cancer Institute (NCI) was established in 1973 as a result of the National Cancer Act of 1971. The National Program of Cancer Registries (NPCR) was established by Congress through the Cancer Registries Amendment Act in 1992, and administered by the Centers for Disease Control and Prevention (CDC). NPCR and SEER together collect cancer data for the entire U.S. population. CDC and NCI, in collaboration with the North American Association of Central Cancer Registries, have been publishing annual federal cancer statistics in the United States Cancer Statistics: Incidence and Mortality report. Information maintained in the cancer registry includes: demographic information, medical history, diagnostic findings, cancer therapy and follow up details. The data is used to evaluate patient outcome, quality of life, provide follow-up information, calculate survival rates, analyze referral pattern, allocate resources at regional or state level, report cancer incidence as required under state law, and evaluate efficacy of treatment modalities.

There exist population-based cancer registries, hospital cancer registries (also called hospital-based cancer registries), and special purpose registries.

== History ==
In 1926, Yale-New Haven Hospital became the first to set up a cancer registry. In 1956, the American College of Surgeons (ACoS) formally adopted a policy to encourage, through their Approvals Program, the development of hospital-based cancer registries. In 1973, the Surveillance, Epidemiology and End Results (SEER) Program of NCI established the first national cancer registry program. In 1992, U.S. Public Law 102-515 established the National Program of Cancer Registries (NPCR); it is administered by the US Centers for Disease Control and Prevention (CDC). By 1993, most states considered cancer a reportable disease.

== Types ==
=== Population-based cancer registry ===
Population-based cancer registries monitor the frequency of new cancer cases (so-called incident cases) every year in well defined populations and over time by collecting case reports from different sources (treatment facilities, clinicians and pathologists, and death certificates). The frequency of these incident cases are expected per 100,000 of the mother population. If an unexpected accumulation can be observed, a hypothesis about possible causes is generated. This hypothesis is investigated in a second step by collecting more detailed data. The aim is to recognize and to reduce risks. Population-based registries can also monitor the effects of preventive measures. All population-based central registries in the United States and Canada are members of the North American Association of Central Cancer Registries. This organization acts as a voice for the registries when dealing with national standard-setting organizations, sets standards for digital cancer record transmission, and certifies the registries for the quality of their data, among other functions.

=== Hospital cancer registry ===
Hospital cancer registries aim at the improvement of cancer therapy, improve quality of care, evaluate adherence to guidelines, etc. They also serve as a source for epidemiological studies. Therefore, they have to collect detailed data about diagnosis, therapy, dates of important milestones in treatment, etc. Improvements can be achieved by:

- comparison of therapy – which therapy is the best for patients with similar characteristics
- comparison of therapists – which hospital, which physician has the best results under the same conditions (quality management)
- evaluation of adherence to guidelines
- evaluation of timeliness of interventions (time to diagnosis, time to initiation of treatment, etc.) and their effect on prognosis
- support of treatment – registries can improve information about a patient and help to provide an optimal treatment by planning therapies and generating reminders

=== Cooperation ===
Since the data needed by hospital cancer registries usually include those of population-based cancer registries and both use the same classifications, data can be sent from a hospital cancer registry to a population-based registry thus reducing documentation efforts. Important barriers and facilitators in this process include clear rules on data sharing, which in many countries may be problematic.

Some hospital and population-based cancer registries report their incidence data to national organizations that aggregate and publish the data, but in many countries the data are not centrally managed. The way in which these data are formatted to be submitted to these organizations are determined by standards released by standard-setting organizations. Edits are run on the data to check for inaccuracies and duplicate cases before being submitted electronically. Different organizations have different standards for data reliability and completeness, and some award certifications based on the adherence to these standards.

== Registries by country ==
=== Sweden ===
The Swedish Cancer Registry was established in 1958. Health care providers in Sweden are required to report newly detected cancer cases diagnosed at clinical, morphological, and laboratory examination (as well as those discovered during autopsy) to the registry. Every year, the regional registries send cancer data to the National Cancer Register. The information available in the registry include patient's personal information (PIN, sex, age and place of residence), medical records (date of diagnosis, site of the tumor, method used for diagnosis, and hospital where the patient is being treated), and follow-up data (date and cause of death or date of migration).

=== United Kingdom ===
The UK's National Cancer Register is maintained by the National Cancer Registration and Analysis Service (NCRAS), which is one of the two disease registration services operating within the National Disease Registration Service (NDRS). The service is part of the NHS in England. Individuals who do not want their personal information to be included in the register are able to opt out.

=== United States ===
==== SEER Registries ====
The Surveillance, Epidemiology, and End Results (SEER) Program of the National Cancer Institute collects and publish data on cancer incidence and survival throughout the United States. The information from population-based cancer registries covers approximately 28 percent of the US population. This coverage includes 26 percent of African Americans, 41 percent of Hispanics, 43 percent of Native Americans and Alaska Natives, 54 percent of Asians, and 71 percent of Hawaiian/Pacific Islanders. The SEER program population-based cancer registries include Arizona Indians, Cherokee Nation, Connecticut, Detroit, Georgia Center for Cancer Statistics (Atlanta, Great Georgia, and Rural Georgia), Greater Bay Area Cancer Registry (San Francisco-Oakland and San Jose-Monterey), Greater California, Hawaii, Iowa, Kentucky, Los Angeles, Louisiana, New Jersey, New Mexico, Seattle-Puget Sound, and Utah. Selection of the geographic areas is based on the ability to operate and maintain a high quality population-based cancer reporting system.

==== National Program of Cancer Registries (NPCR) ====
The National Program of Cancer Registries is a U.S.-based program with state-based cancer registries that collect, analyze, and report cancer cases and deaths to a central cancer registry. NPCR was established in 1992 and administered by the CDC. NPCR supports central cancer registries in 46 states, the District of Columbia, Puerto Rico, the U.S. Pacific Islands, and the U.S. Virgin Islands. This data covers approximately 97% of the U.S. population. State cancer registries monitor cancer trends, determine cancer patterns, direct planning and evaluation of cancer control programs, help set priorities for allocating health resources, promote research, and provide information on cancer incidence. The data collected helps public health professionals understand and address the cancer burden. The twelfth volume of Cancer Incidence in Five Continents, published by the International Agency for Research on Cancer, includes cancer incidence data from 32 NPCR-funded registries. NPCR's future direction is to expand the use of information technology designed to support, improve, and enhance the management and exchange of electronic data in cancer surveillance. ⁣

==== National Firefighter Registry ====
Due to the lack of central and comprehensive sources of data, research on cancer rates amongst firefighters has been challenging. On July 7, 2018, Congress passed the Firefighter Cancer Registry Act of 2018 requiring the Centers for Disease Control and Prevention to create the National Firefighter Registry for Cancer designed to collect data on cancer rates among U.S. firefighters.

== City-based Registries ==
The Cali Cancer Registry (Registro Poblacional de Cancer de Cali in Spanish) started in 1962 as a research program of the Department of Pathology of the University of Valle School of Medicine in Cali, Colombia. Currently, Cali Cancer Registry is recognized by the International Agency for Research on Cancer (IARC), an entity of WHO. Cali Cancer Registry uses quality assurance procedures based on IARC guidelines to validate the quality of cancer registration. Due to advances in cancer control and the Cali Cancer Registry, Cali is the first city to implement the initiative C/Can 2025: Challenge of Cities Against Cancer, a project of the Union for International Cancer Control (UICC) that seeks to increase the coverage and quality of oncological care in cities with more than one million inhabitants in low and middle income countries.
