= Chien-Pai Han =

Chinese American statistician (1936-2020)

- Born: December 17, 1936
- Died: September 1, 2020 (aged 83)
- Education: Harvard University
- Known for: Statistical inference, Multivariate analysis, Discriminant analysis, Sample survey methods, Shrinkage estimation
- Scientific career
- Fields: Statistics
- Workplaces: Iowa State University, University of Texas at Arlington
- Doctoral advisor: Arthur P. Dempster

Chien-Pai Han (December 17, 1936 - September 1, 2020) was an American statistician known for his contributions to statistical inference, multivariate analysis, discriminant analysis, and sample survey methodology. Han held faculty positions at Iowa State University (1967-1982) and the University of Texas at Arlington (1982-2017).

== Early life and education ==
Han was born in Hunan, China on December 17, 1936 and grew up in Taiwan. He earned his Ph.D. in Statistics from Harvard University in 1967, where he studied under the supervision of Arthur P. Dempster. He completed his Ph.D. in Statistics at Harvard University in 1967, where his doctoral advisor was Arthur P. Dempster. His dissertation was titled Testing the Homogeneity of a Set of Correlated Variances.

== Academic career ==
Han began his academic career at Iowa State University in 1967 as an associate professor in the Department of Statistics, where he contributed to research and teaching in mathematical statistics. During his tenure at Iowa State, he collaborated extensively with T. A. Bancroft. He remained at Iowa State University for 15 years.

Han joined the Department of Mathematics at the University of Texas at Arlington (UTA) in 1982, where he became a central figure in developing the statistics program. Over the course of his 35-year tenure at UTA, he supervised 20 Ph.D. students and 36 M.S. students, and he was known for his mentorship of junior faculty and graduate students. Han retired in 2017 and was named Professor Emeritus.

== Research contributions ==
Han's research contributions spanned multiple areas of statistical theory and methodology. His early work focused on discriminant analysis, particularly the distribution of discriminant functions when covariance matrices have special structures. His work in this area provided theoretical foundations for classification problems in multivariate analysis.

Han made contributions to survey sampling theory, including work on double sampling with partial information on auxiliary variables and the efficiency of ratio estimators under different sampling schemes. His research also addressed shrinkage estimation, analysis of variance for incomplete models, estimation in random effects models, and central limit theorems for nonlinear statistics in repeated sampling from finite populations.

Later in his career, Han worked on quality control and process capability indices, computational statistics, and applications of statistical methods to practical problems

Han was elected a Fellow of the American Statistical Association in 1998.

== Books and monographs ==
- T. A. Bancroft & C.-P. Han (1981). Statistical Theory and Inference in Research. Marcel Dekker.
- C.-P. Han & D. L. Hawkins (1996). A Central Limit Theorem for Certain Nonlinear Statistics in Repeated Sampling of a Finite Population. Technical Report 312, University of Texas at Arlington.

== Selected publications ==
- C.-P. Han (1969). "Distribution of discriminant function when covariance matrices are proportional." Annals of Mathematical Statistics, 40(3), 979-985.
- C.-P. Han (1968). "Double sampling with partial information on auxiliary variables." Journal of the American Statistical Association, 63(324), 1142-1151.
- P. Chandhok & C.-P. Han (1990). "On the efficiency of the ratio estimator under Midzuno scheme with measurement errors." Journal of the Indian Statistical Association, 28, 31-39.
- C.-P. Han (1975). "Power of analysis of variance test procedures for incompletely specified fixed models." Annals of Statistics, 3(4), 797-808.
- D. L. Hawkins & C.-P. Han (1989). "A minimum average risk approach to shrinkage estimators of the normal mean." Annals of the Institute of Statistical Mathematics, 41(2), 347-363.
- P. Chiou & C.-P. Han (1996). "Estimation of error variance in one-way random model." Metrika, 44, 41-51.
- Z. Li, Q. Li, C.-P. Han & B. Li (2014). "A hybrid approach for low-rank approximation of covariance matrices." Computational Statistics & Data Analysis, 79, 227-235.
- C.-P. Han & D. L. Hawkins (1996). Estimating Transition Probabilities from Aggregate Samples Augmented by Haphazard Recaptures II: The Case of Covariates. Technical Report 319, University of Texas at Arlington.

== Death ==
Han died on September 1, 2020, following a long illness. He was 83 years old.
