= North American Association of Central Cancer Registries =

NAACCR
- Founded: 1987
- Location: Springfield, Illinois
- Region served: United States and Canada
- Website: naaccr.org

The North American Association of Central Cancer Registries, Inc. (NAACCR), established in 1987, is a collaborative umbrella organization for cancer registries, governmental agencies, professional associations, and private groups in North America interested in enhancing the quality and use of cancer registry data. All central cancer registries in the United States and Canada are members.

== Organizational mission ==
The North American Association of Central Cancer Registries, Inc. is a professional organization that develops and promotes uniform data standards for cancer registration; provides education and training; certifies population-based registries; aggregates and publishes data from central cancer registries; and promotes the use of cancer surveillance data and systems for cancer control and epidemiologic research, public health programs, and patient care to reduce the burden of cancer in North America.

=== Leadership and committees ===
NAACCR is governed by a ten-member board of directors. The NAACCR Executive Director is an ex-officio member of the board. NAACCR members participate in five steering committees, several special committees, and temporary ad hoc committees which help drive much of the association's work. These include:

Steering committees:

- Standardization and Registry Development Steering Committee
- Research and Data Use Steering Committee
- Communications Steering Committee
- Professional Development Steering Committee
- Strategic Planning and Alliances Steering Committee

=== Sponsoring member organizations ===
NAACCR is sponsored by eight member organizations, which participate in quarterly Sponsoring Member Organization meetings and provide input on NAACCR's cancer surveillance activities:

- American Cancer Society
- American College of Surgeons Cancer Programs
- Canadian Partnership Against Cancer
- Centers for Disease Control and Prevention
- College of American Pathologists
- National Cancer Institute
- National Cancer Registrars Association
- Public Health Agency of Canada

== Main activities ==
=== Cancer data standards ===
One of NAACCR's first goals was to achieve consensus on cancer registration standards among the many standard-setting organizations in the United States and Canada, in order to facilitate compilation and comparison of information across different registries. Today, nearly all registries in North America have adopted the NAACCR consensus standards. NAACCR updates these standards annually to meet the changing needs of the registry community.

=== Cancer research ===
Every year, NAACCR issues a call for data from its registry members. These data are evaluated for accuracy and compiled into analytic files to produce CINA, an annual statistical monograph of cancer incidence in the United States and Canada; CINA+ Online, an online query system of cancer incidence data for the previous five years from selected member registries; and CINA Deluxe, a data file for NAACCR researchers to conduct cancer surveillance systems. NAACCR also collaborates with other cancer organizations to produce the Annual Report to the Nation on the Status of Cancer.

=== Education and training ===
In order to develop and maintain the skills and knowledge of cancer reporters in North America, NAACCR creates and releases training workshops, resource materials, and continuing education opportunities. These include online webinars, in-person workshops, scholarships and grants, and other resources. Since its inception, NAACCR has also hosted an annual meeting, focusing on a different theme each year.
