= Lisa M. Sullivan =

Biostatistician

Lisa Marie Sullivan (born 1961) is a biostatistician associated with the Framingham Heart Study. She is a professor of biostatistics at Boston University, where she is associate dean for education in the School of Public Health and the former chair of the biostatistics department.

== Education ==
Sullivan is a graduate of the University of New Hampshire, and earned her Ph.D. at Boston University in 1993 under the supervision of Ralph B. D'Agostino.

== Books ==
She is the coauthor of Introductory Applied Biostatistics (with D'Agostino and Alexa S. Beiser, Thomson Learning, 2006), the author of Essentials of Biostatistics in Public Health (Jones and Bartlett, 2008; 3rd ed., 2018), and the author of Biostatistics for Population Health: A Primer (Jones and Bartlett, 2021). She is co-editor of the Wiley Encyclopedia of Clinical Trials.

== Recognition ==
Sullivan was named Mosteller Statistician of the Year in 2013 by the Boston Chapter of the American Statistical Association. She was the 2020 winner of the Mu Sigma Rho Statistics Education Award. She became a Fellow of the American Statistical Association in 2021.
