= Santa Barbara City College =

Public community college in Santa Barbara, California

Coordinates: 34°24′23″N 119°41′55″W

- Type: Public community college
- Established: 1909
- Parent institution: Santa Barbara Community College District
- Endowment: $28.1 million
- President: Helen Benjamin
- Students: 18,848
- Location: Santa Barbara, California, U.S.
- Campus: Suburban, 74 acres (30 ha)
- Colors: Red and white
- Nickname: Vaqueros
- Sporting affiliations: CCCAA – WSC, SCFA (football)
- Website: sbcc.edu

Santa Barbara City College (SBCC) is a public community college in Santa Barbara, California, United States. It opened in 1909 and is located on a 74-acre (30 ha) campus.

== History ==
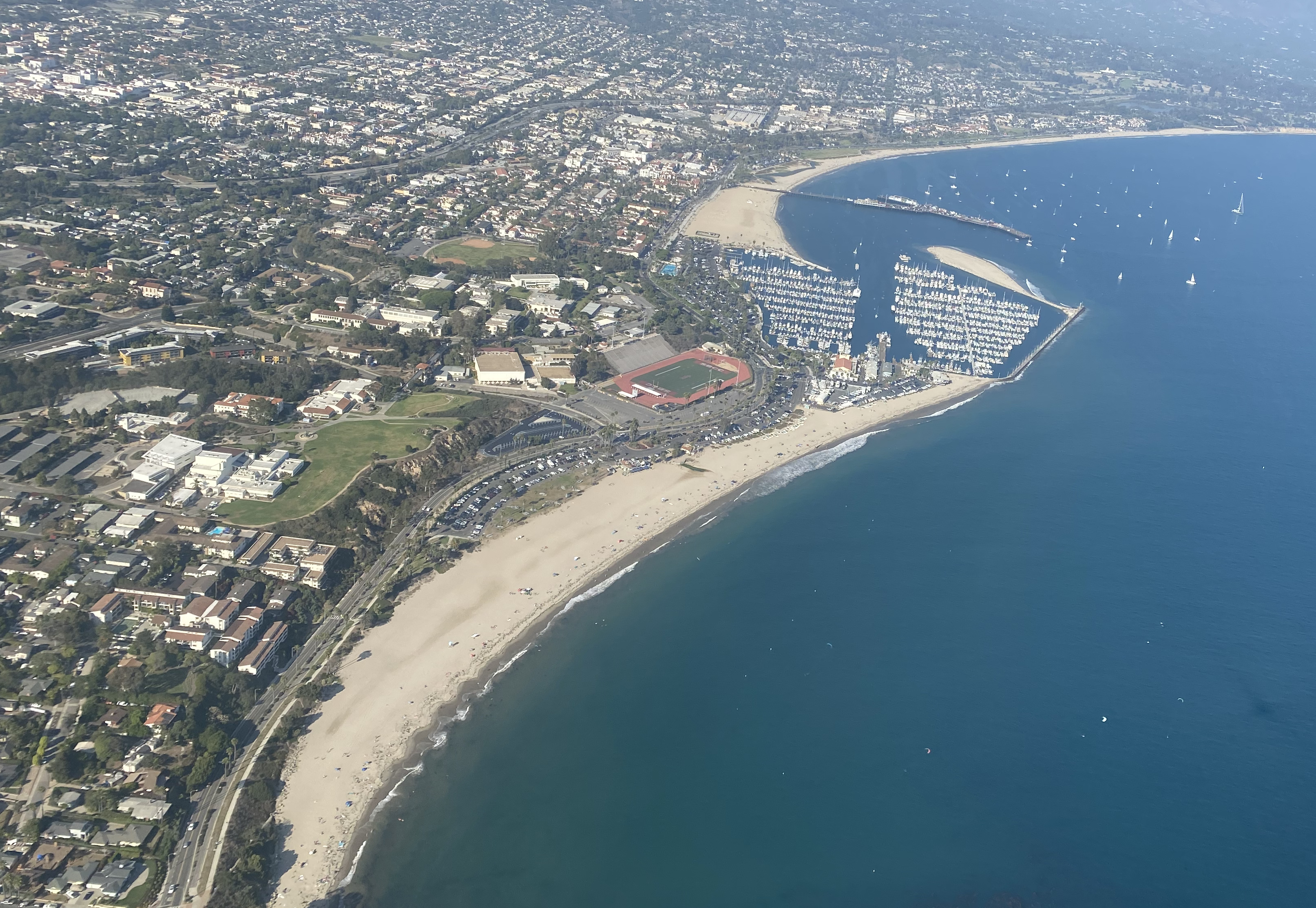
Aerial view of Santa Barbara City College (2020)

Santa Barbara City College was established by the Santa Barbara High School District in 1909, making it one of the oldest community colleges in California. The college was discontinued shortly after World War I. Its work was largely taken over by the Santa Barbara State Normal School, which became the Santa Barbara State College, and later, the University of California, Santa Barbara.

SBCC was reorganized by the high school district in the fall of 1946. Called Santa Barbara Junior College from its inception, the Santa Barbara Board of Education formally changed the name to Santa Barbara City College in July 1959. Also in the summer of 1959, the institution moved to its present and permanent location on the Santa Barbara Mesa, former site of the University of California, Santa Barbara. Situated on a 74-acre bluff, the campus overlooks the harbor and Pacific Ocean. Passage of a 1969 construction bond issue and a 1973 land acquisition bond issue ensured that the college would have a single, consolidated Mesa campus.

In 2013, Santa Barbara City College was awarded the Aspen Prize for Community College Excellence.

== Academics ==
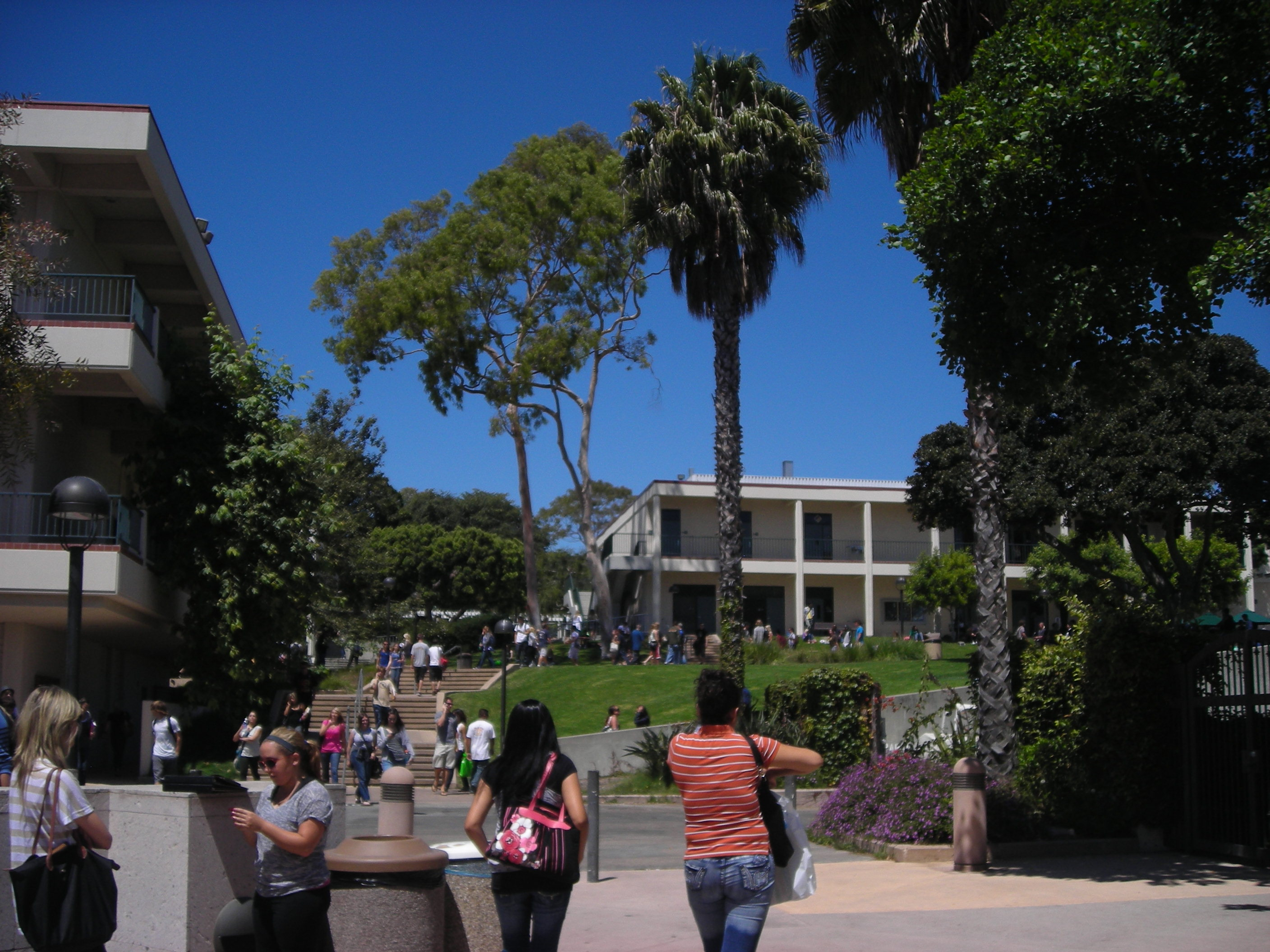
The campus at Santa Barbara City College

The School of Media Arts (SOMA) was established in 2001 to focus on applied communication, visual literacy and digital media. The school covers many areas of interest, including film studies, film production, photography, and computer and multimedia arts.

The music department at features several performance groups, including three jazz ensembles, large and small vocal ensembles, a concert band, and a full symphony orchestra.

The automotive program has been certified by the National Institute for Automotive Service Excellence (ASE) as a master training institution, having met industry standards in all eight of the automotive specialty areas: engine repair, engine performance, heating and air conditioning, electrical systems, automatic transmissions, manual transmission and axle, and brakes and front end.

Santa Barbara City College's Marine Diving Technologies Program is the only community college degree program in the nation which is accredited by the Association of Commercial Diving Educators (ACDE), the International Diving Schools Association (IDSA), and the National Association of Underwater Instructors (NAUI). The program trains and certifies for all levels of SCUBA diving.

The Cancer Information Management Program at Santa Barbara City College offers two types of degrees: an Associate in Science in Cancer Information Management, and the Certificate of Completion in Cancer Information Management. It is one of the few Cancer Information Management programs in the nation to currently offer an associate degree which is required to sit for the National Exam to become a certified tumor registrar with the National Cancer Registrars Association starting in 2009.

The student newspaper is named The Channels.

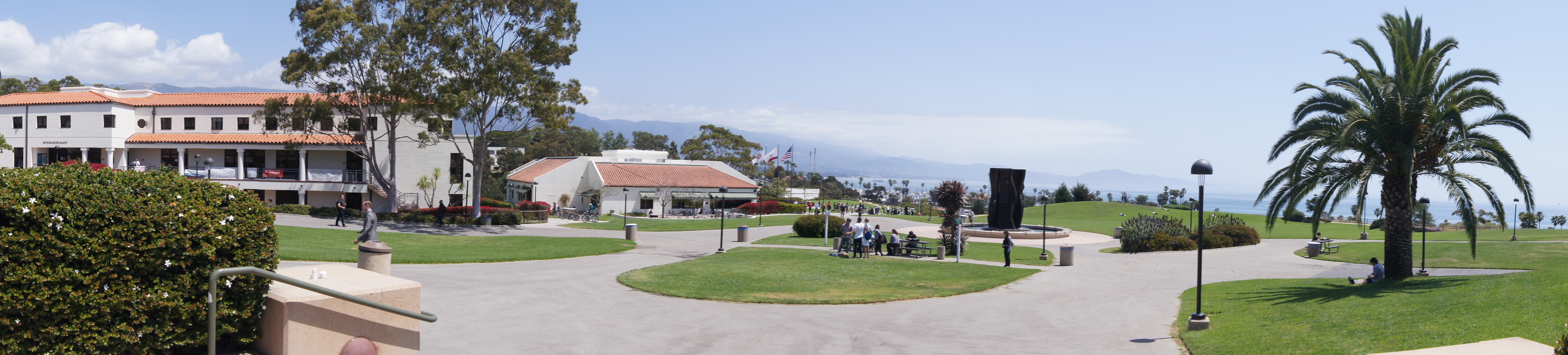
Santa Barbara west campus

Undergraduate demographics as of fall 2023
Race and ethnicity	Total
White	40%
Hispanic	38%
Two or more races	6%
Asian	5%
International student	4%
Unknown	4%
Black	2%
Economic diversity
Low-income (Note: The percentage of students who received an income-based federal Pell grant intended for low-income students.)	19%
Affluent (Note: The percentage of students who are a part of the American middle class at the bare minimum.)	81%

== Athletics ==
The college's athletic teams are known as the Vaqueros. Santa Barbara competes as a member of the California Community College Athletic Association (CCCAA) in the Western State Conference (WSC) for all sports except football, which competes in Southern California Football Association (SCFA). City College offers intercollegiate athletic competition with nine men sports and eleven women's sports.

Santa Barbara City College has won 11 CCCAA State Championship with the women's water polo team being the most recent winner in 2017. In 2017–2018, the Vaqueros won a WSC-leading six conference championships. The SBCC Vaqueros soccer and football teams play at the 10,000-capacity La Playa Stadium in Santa Barbara.

A number of SBCC alumni have gone on to play professional sports. This group is highlighted by Jesse Orosco, Tyler Gilbert, Dylan Axelrod, Delwyn Young, Gary Woods, Lemmie Miller, and Scott Randall (Major League Baseball); Larry Moriarty, Mitch Wishnowsky, and Booker Brown (National Football League); and Don Ford (National Basketball Association). Orosco is a member of the CCCAA Hall of Fame, along with former SBCC coaches and administrators Pat Moorhouse and Bob Dinaberg.

In 2019, the Santa Barbara City College established the SBCC Vaqueros Hall of Fame to recognize athletes, coaches, contributors and teams from their past. The inaugural Hall of Fame Class of 2019 included former head coaches/administrators Bob Dinaberg, Pat Moorhouse and Bud Revis; student-athletes Booker Brown, Gary Woods, Marina Gomez, and Debbie Ekola; and the 1977 State Champion women's track & field team.

== Notable people ==
=== Notable alumni ===
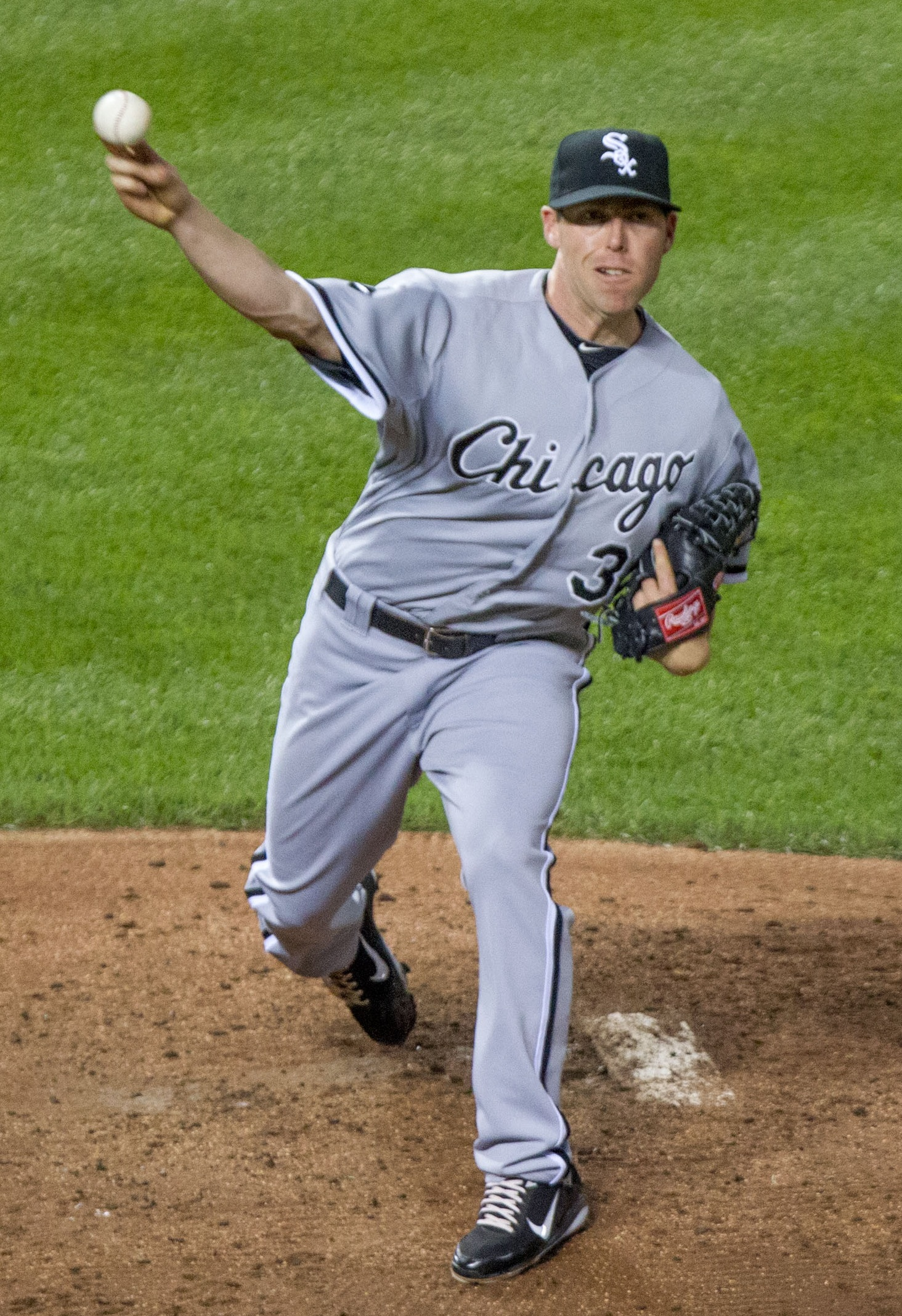
Dylan Axelrod

- Jaime Ambriz, professional soccer player
- Ron Anderson, professional basketball player
- Dylan Axelrod, professional baseball player
- Eion Bailey, actor
- David Crosby, folk rock musician
- Tyler Gilbert, professional baseball player
- Ben Howland, college basketball coach
- James Kiffe, professional soccer player
- Ozzy Lusth, contestant on Survivor: Cook Islands and Survivor: Micronesia
- Randolph Mantooth, actor, writer, and producer
- Mansour bin Zayed Al Nahyan, deputy prime minister of the United Arab Emirates and minister of presidential affairs
- Jesse Orosco, professional baseball player
- Chris Plante, television reporter and host of eponymous radio show
- Elliot Rodger, perpetrator of the Isla Vista attacks
- Grace Tame, Australian activist and advocate for survivors of sexual assault
- Mitch Wishnowsky, professional football player
- Delwyn Young, professional baseball player

=== Notable faculty ===
- Kathryn Ish, acting teacher
