= Walter T. Federer =

American statistician (1915–2008)

Walter Theodore Federer (August 23, 1915 - April 14, 2008) was an American statistician and biometrician. For most of his professional career he was professor of Biological Statistics in the College of Agricultural and Life Sciences at Cornell University, where he founded and led the Biometrics Unit.

== Early life and education ==
Federer was born and raised in Cheyenne, Wyoming, where his parents were homesteaders. Before entering university, he was a professional rodeo rider. He received a B.S. in agronomy from Colorado State University. He went on to earn an M.Sc. in plant breeding from Kansas State College of Agriculture and Applied Sciences (now Kansas State University) in 1941, followed by a Ph.D. in mathematical statistics from Iowa State College (now Iowa State University) in 1948. His Ph.D. thesis topic was Evaluation of Variance Components from a Group of Experiments with Multiple Classifications, written under the tutelage of W. G. Cochran and Alexander M. Mood.

== Career ==
Federer's early career included roles as Associate Geneticist on the Guayule Research Project for the United States Department of Agriculture in Salinas, California, and as Associate Statistician with the Agricultural Marketing Service in Ames, Iowa, while completing his doctoral studies.

He is best known for his long and influential career at Cornell University, where he served as Professor of Biological Statistics in the College of Agricultural and Life Sciences. He joined the department in 1948 after completing his Ph.D. studies and stayed for 60 years. Federer founded the Biometrics Unit in the Department of Plant Breeding and was chair of the unit for 29 years. In 1978, he was awarded the Liberty Hyde Bailey Professor of Statistics Chair. After retiring in 1986, he took emeritus professor status and continued teaching, consulting and researching for another 22 years. Federer was an elected fellow of the American Statistical Association, the American Association for the Advancement of Science, the Royal Statistical Society, and the Institute of Mathematical Statistics. He was an elected member of the International Statistical Institute. Among many services to his profession, Federer was president of the Eastern North American Region (ENAR) of the International Biometric Society and was chairman and executive secretary of the Committee of Presidents of Statistical Societies.

Federer was a strong advocate of the synergy between research, teaching and consulting in academia and his own work concentrated on experiment and treatment design, analysis of variance, and the application of statistical methodology. After he became emeritus professor, at the age of 70, he taught himself how to use modern computers, programming in Gauss, Mathematica and SAS.

Throughout his career he published about 900 articles and nine textbooks. His first book, Experimental Design: Theory and Application, "...became a major scholarly contribution and served as a day-to-day tool of statistical practice for innumerable researchers in agriculture and other fields."

== Personal life ==
Federer was twice married. In 1945 he married his first wife, Lillian Elizabeth Vasey, with whom he adopted a son. They remained married until her death in 1978. Federer married Edna Hammond Morusty in 1982; she had three daughters from a previous marriage.

Federer died on April 14, 2008, in Ithaca, New York, at the age of 92.

== Books ==
- Experimental Design: Theory and Application. New York, New York: The Macmillan Company. 1955. p. 591.
- Statistics and Society: Data Collection and Interpretation. New York, New York: Dekker. 1972. ISBN 978-0-8247-6083-0.
- with Balaam, L. N. (1973). Bibliography on Experiment and Treatment Design, Pre-1968. Hafner Publishing Company. p. 767. ISBN 978-0-02-844600-4.
- Raktoe, B. L.; Hedayat, A.; Federer, Walter Theodore (1981). Factorial Designs. New York, New York: John Wiley & Sons. ISBN 978-0-471-09040-3.
- Statistical Design and Analysis for Intercropping Experiments. Vol. 1: Two Crops. New York, New York: Springer. 1993. p. 298. ISBN 978-0-387-97923-6.
- Statistical Design and Analysis for Intercropping Experiments. Vol. 2: Three Or More Crops. New York, New York: Springer. 1999. p. 262. ISBN 978-0-387-98533-6.
- with King, Freedom (2007). Variations on Split Plot and Split Block Experiment Designs. Hoboken, New Jersey: John Wiley & Sons. ISBN 978-0-470-08149-5.
