= T. A. Bancroft =

American statistician (1907–1986)

- Born: January 2, 1907; Columbus, Mississippi
- Died: July 26, 1986 (aged 79); Ames, Iowa

Academic background
- Education: University of Florida (BA); University of Michigan (MA); Iowa State University (PhD)
- Thesis: Tests of Significance Considered as an Aid in Statistical Methodology
- Doctoral advisor: William Gemmell Cochran

Theodore Alfonso Bancroft (January 2, 1907 – July 26, 1986) was an American statistician.

He earned a bachelor's of art degree in mathematics at the University of Florida in 1927, a master's of art degree in mathematics at the University of Michigan in 1934, and a PhD from Iowa State University in 1943. His dissertation, Tests of Significance Considered as an Aid in Statistical Methodology, was supervised by William Gemmell Cochran.

He joined the faculty of Iowa State University in 1949 and served as head of the statistics department from 1950 to 1972. He retired in 1977.

He was elected a Fellow of the American Statistical Association in 1956 and the Institute of Mathematical Statistics in 1972. He was also a Fellow of the American Association for the Advancement of Science and an Elected Member of the International Statistical Institute. He served as the president of the American Statistical Association in 1970.

Bancroft's papers are archived at Iowa State University.

== Works ==
=== Books ===
- Statistical Theory and Inference in Research with R. L. Anderson (1952)
- Topics in Intermediate Statistical Methods
- Statistical Theory and Inference in Research with Chien-Pai Han (1981), Marcel Dekker.

This textbook, co-authored with Chien-Pai Han, covered fundamental principles of statistical theory and their applications to research problems.

=== Articles ===
- Bancroft, T. A. (June 1944). "On Biases in Estimation Due to the Use of Preliminary Tests of Significance". The Annals of Mathematical Statistics. 15 (2): 190–204. doi:10.1214/aoms/1177731284.
