= Surveillance, Epidemiology, and End Results =

Program of the National Cancer Institute, US

SEER Cancer Statistics, Age-Specific SEER Incidence Rates, 2003-2007

The Surveillance, Epidemiology, and End Results (SEER) program of the National Cancer Institute (NCI) is a source of epidemiologic information on the incidence and survival rates of cancer in the United States.

== The Program ==
SEER collects and publishes cancer incidence and survival data from population-based cancer registries covering approximately 45.9% of the population of the United States. SEER coverage includes 39.6% of Whites, 43.5% of African Americans, 64.9% of Hispanics, 59.3% of American Indians and Alaska Natives, 68.2% of Asians, and 69.9% of Hawaiian/Pacific Islanders. The SEER Program registries routinely collect data on patient demographics, primary tumor site, tumor morphology and stage at diagnosis, first course of treatment, and follow-up for vital status. The SEER Program is the only comprehensive source of population-based information in the United States that includes stage of cancer at the time of diagnosis and patient survival data.

== History ==
SEER began collecting data on cancer cases on January 1, 1973, in the states of Connecticut, Iowa, New Mexico, Utah, Hawaii, and the metropolitan areas of Detroit and San Francisco-Oakland. By 2001 the program included information on major population centers in Georgia, Washington, Louisiana, New Jersey, Puerto Rico, Alaska, California, Kentucky. This includes specific Native American populations in Arizona, Alaskan Natives, and Hispanic populations in California.

National Cancer Institute funds for the program are combined with funding from the Centers for Disease Control and Prevention (CDC) through the National Program of Cancer Registries and with funding from the involved states.

NCI staff work with the North American Association of Central Cancer Registries (NAACCR) to guide all state registries to achieve data content and compatibility acceptable for pooling data and improving national estimates. The SEER team is developing computer applications to unify cancer registration systems and to analyze and disseminate population-based data. Use of surveillance data for research is being improved through Web-based access to the data and analytic tools, and linking with other national data sources. For example, a web-based tool for public health officials and policy makers, State Cancer Profiles, provides a user-friendly interface for finding cancer statistics for specific states and counties.

Quality control has been an integral part of SEER since its inception. Every year, studies are conducted in SEER areas to evaluate the quality and completeness of the data being reported.
