= Ralph B. D'Agostino =

American biostatistician

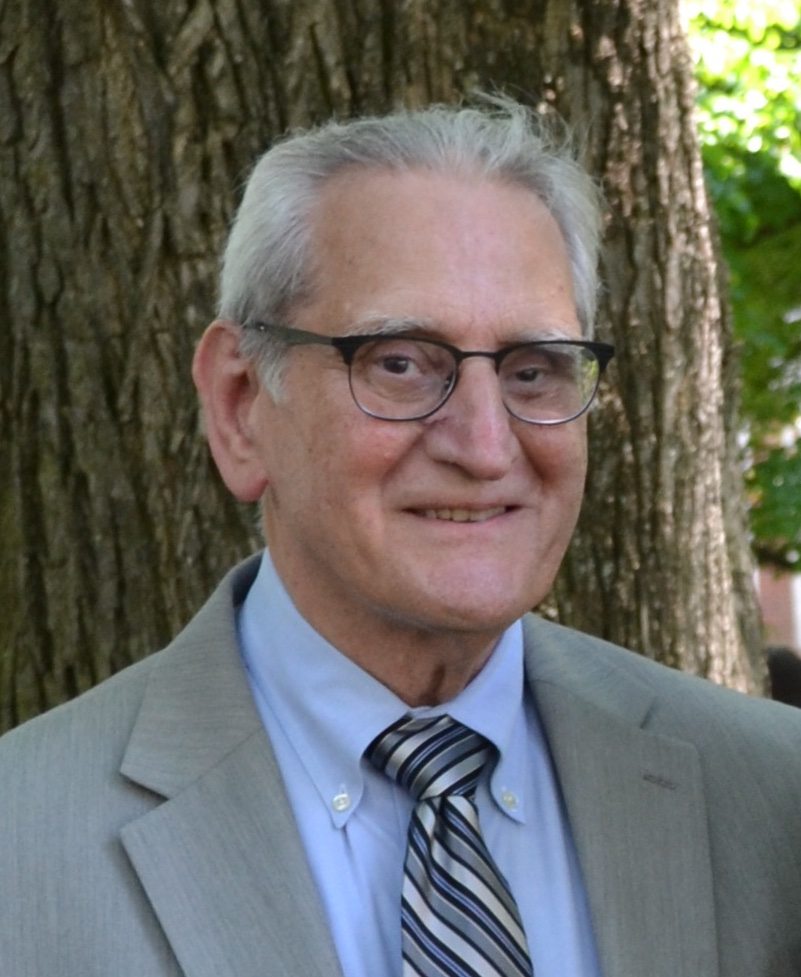
- Born: Ralph Benedict D'Agostino; August 16, 1940; Somerville, Massachusetts
- Died: September 27, 2023 (aged 83); Winston-Salem, North Carolina
- Education: Boston University (A.B. summa cum laude, 1962; A.M., 1964); Harvard University (Ph.D., 1968)
- Known for: Biostatistics
- Spouse: LeiLanie Carta (m. 1965)
- Children: Ralph Benedict; LeiLanie Maria
- Awards: Fellow of the American Statistical Association; Food and Drug Administration Advisory Committee Service Award (2008)
- Scientific career
- Fields: Statistics; Epidemiology; Mathematics
- Institutions: Boston University
- Thesis: Estimation of Percentiles of Continuous Populations (1968)
- Doctoral advisors: Frederick Mosteller; William Gemmell Cochran
- Doctoral students: Lisa M. Sullivan

Ralph Benedict D'Agostino Sr. (August 16, 1940 – September 27, 2023) was an American biostatistician and professor of Mathematics/Statistics, Biostatistics and Epidemiology at Boston University. He was the director of the Statistics and Consulting Unit of the Framingham Study and the executive director of the M.A./Ph.D. program in biostatistics at Boston University. He was elected a fellow of the American Statistical Association in 1990 and of the American Heart Association in 1991.

His son, Ralph B. D'Agostino Jr., is also a biostatistician and fellow of the American Statistical Association (elected 2013).

== Education and career ==
D'Agostino graduated from Boston University (A.B. summa cum laude) with a major in mathematics in 1962 and with a master's degree mathematics in 1964. He completed his Ph.D. in statistics at Harvard University under the joint supervision of William Cochran and Frederick Mosteller in 1968. He joined as faculty in the Department of Mathematics (now the Department of Mathematics and Statistics) at Boston University, where he served as department chair, director of the Boston University Statistics and Consulting Unit (1986–2015), and co-director of the biostatistics department's MA/Ph.D. program (1988–2021).

D'Agostino is known for D'Agostino's K^{2} test, a goodness-of-fit measure of departure from normality.

D'Agostino was a co-principal investigator and the director of data analysis and statistics at the Framingham Heart Study. He co-authored 305 peer-reviewed papers involving the Framingham cohort between 1984–2019. D'Agostino was instrumental in developing several risk prediction models including, a global cardiovascular disease risk function, a coronary heart disease risk assessment function, an instrument for predicting acute ischemic heart disease, and a stroke health risk appraisal function. He also played a key role in the development of guidelines for cholesterol.

D'Agostino has played a pivotal role in the journal Statistics in Medicine since its inaugural volume in 1982. He contributed an article to the first edition titled "The Logistic Function as an Aid in the Detection of Acute Coronary Disease in Emergency Patients (a Case Study)". He assumed the position of senior editor of the journal and served as lead editor for the Tutorials in Biostatistics segment of the journal from 1995 through 2019.

From 2007 through 2021, D’Agostino served as statistical consultant to the editor of The New England Journal of Medicine.

In addition to being a prolific researcher, Professor D'Agostino was a beloved statistics instructor. A selection of quotations from his students, collected when he was awarded the Boston University Metcalf Cup and Prize for Excellence in Teaching include the following: “Professor D’Agostino made it possible for me to understand statistics, something that I thought was impossible.” “Professor D’Agostino’s clarity, obvious intelligence, patience, and wry sense of humor has changed my attitude towards statistics from acceptance to enjoyment.” “I now enjoy, and enjoy using, statistics—something that I had never before imagined.”

== Writing ==
D'Agostino has 745 peer-reviewed papers and with over 305,000 citations in Google Scholar is among the top five most cited researchers in the fields of Statistics, Biostatistics, and Cardiovascular Disease. His H Index stands at 246, among the best numbers in any field. D'Agostino has authored several books, including the following:

- Schiff, D., D'Agostino, R. B. (1996). Practical engineering statistics / Daniel Schiff, Ralph B. D'Agostino. United Kingdom: Wiley.
- D'Agostino, R. B., Sullivan, L. M., Beiser, A. S. (2001). Introductory Applied Biostatistics. United States: Houghton Mifflin Company.
- Cureton, E. E., D'Agostino, R. B. (2013). Factor Analysis: An Applied Approach. United States: Taylor & Francis.

D'Agostino has also served as the editor of several books, including the following:

- Goodness-of-Fit-Techniques. (1986). Switzerland: Taylor & Francis. (Michael A. Stephens, Ralph B. D'Agostino)
- Mathematical Modeling: Applications in Emergency Health Services. (1984). United Kingdom: Haworth Press. (Editors: Harvey Wolfe, Larry J. Shuman, Ralph B. D'Agostino)
- Tutorials in Biostatistics, Statistical Methods in Clinical Studies. (2005). Germany: Wiley. (Editor: Ralph D'Agostino)
- Pharmaceutical Statistics Using SAS: A Practical Guide. (2007). Switzerland: SAS Institute. (Editors: Alex Dmitrienko, Christy Chuang-Stein, Ralph B. D'Agostino)
- Wiley Encyclopedia of Clinical Trials, 4 Volume Set. (2008). United Kingdom: Wiley. (Editors: Joseph Massaro, Lisa Sullivan, Ralph B. D'Agostino)
- Therapeutic Strategies in Cardiovascular Risk. (2008). United Kingdom: Clinical Publishing. (Editors: Ian M. Graham, Ralph B. D'Agostino)
- Biosimilar Clinical Development: Scientific Considerations and New Methodologies. (2016). United States: CRC Press. (Editors: Bo Jin, PhD, Kerry B. Barker, Ralph B. D'Agostino, Sr., Sandeep M. Menon, Siyan Xu)

== Recognition ==
Professor D'Agostino has received many honors. He received the Metcalf Cup and Prize for Excellence in Teaching from Boston University in 1985. He was elected a fellow of the American Statistical Association in 1990 and of the American Heart Association in 1991. He was honored with the FDA Advisory Committee Service Award in 2008, received a Special Citation from the Food and Drug Administration Commissioner in 1981 and 1995, and was named Statistician of the Year by the Boston chapter of the American Heart Association in 1993. Named one of the most influential researchers in clinical medicine since 2014, he was the recipient of the Achievement Award and the Award for Distinguished Service and Contributions from the American Public Health Association in 2014.

== Personal life ==
D'Agostino was born in Sommerville, Massachusetts to Benedetto D'Agostino and Carmela D'Agostino (Piemonte). He married LeiLanie D'Agostino (Carta) on August 28, 1965. LeiLanie played an instrumental role in both his family, helping raise their two children, LeiLanie and Ralph, and his research career. His son, Ralph B. D'Agostino, Jr., is a biostatistics professor at Wake Forest University School of Medicine and fellow of the American Statistical Association (elected 2013). His granddaughter, Lucy D'Agostino McGowan is also a biostatistician and an associate professor in the Department of Statistical Sciences at Wake Forest University. D'Agostino died in his home in North Carolina on September 27, 2023.
