= Ann Zauber =

Epidemiologist and biostatistician

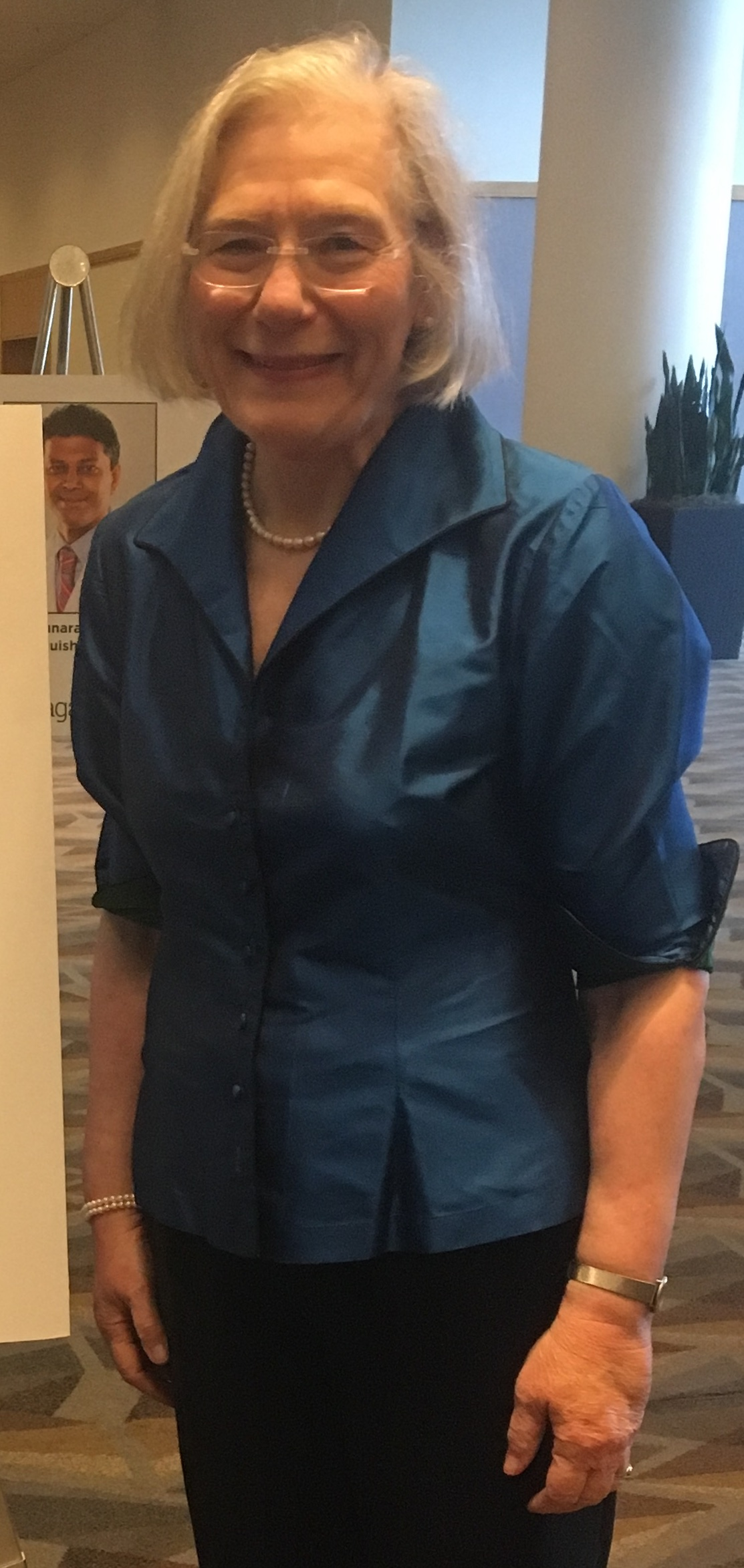

Ann Graham Zauber is an American epidemiologist and biostatistician at the Memorial Sloan Kettering Cancer Center in New York City, primarily interested in colorectal cancer. Her research has demonstrated the effectiveness of colonoscopy and polyp removal at reducing the incidence of this kind of cancer.

Zauber graduated from Hollins University in Virginia and earned her Ph.D. in biostatistics from the Johns Hopkins Bloomberg School of Public Health in Baltimore, Maryland.

In 2012, Zauber was the lead author of a landmark, longitudinal study published in The New England Journal of Medicine demonstrating the long-term effectiveness of colonoscopic polypetcomy in reducing colorectal cancer deaths.

In 2016, she became a Fellow of the American Statistical Association. In 2018, she was awarded the Charles G. Moertel Distinguished Scientific Achievement Award by the World Endoscopy Organization. In 2019, she received the Research Service Award from the American Gastroenterological Association.

Her computer modeling of colorectal cancer has been used by the United States Preventive Services Task Force and Centers for Medicare & Medicaid Services.
