= Canadian Partnership Against Cancer =

Canadian non-profit organization

The Canadian Partnership Against Cancer is an independent, not-for-profit organization funded by the Canadian government to facilitate action on cancer control in Canada. The Partnership works with cancer experts, other charitable organizations, all levels of government, cancer agencies, national health organizations, cancer patients and survivors, and others to implement the Canadian Strategy for Cancer Control. The Partnership's work ranges from prevention and screening, research, supportive care, knowledge transfer, public engagement, and analysis of the cancer system. It uses a collaborative approach that is mindful of patient perspectives, and strives to be responsive to the needs of priority populations, including First Nations, Inuit and Métis peoples, rural and remote communities, and others facing barriers accessing health care in Canada.

== The Partnership's work ==
The Canadian Partnership Against Cancer is mandated by the Government of Canada to implement the Canadian Strategy for Cancer Control. It began operations in 2007 and works with partners across Canada to reduce the burden of cancer through coordinated, system-level change.

Its work focuses on all aspects of cancer control, including prevention, survivorship, palliative and end-of-life care. This is part of their strategic plan, "Sustaining Action Toward A Shared Vision", which is to be implemented from 2012 to 2017 and includes a number of priority areas.

- Prevention and Screening
- Advancing High Quality Diagnosis and Clinical Care
- Person-Centred Perspectives
- Research
- First Nations, Inuit and Métis Peoples Cancer Control
- System Performance
- Knowledge Management
- Public Engagement and Outreach

== History ==
The Partnership owes its origins to the work of the Campaign to Control Cancer, which was a volunteer coalition consisting of more than 700 experts, cancer organizations, and patients advocating for the funding of the Canadian Strategy for Cancer Control. The Canadian Strategy for Cancer Control was drafted as Canada's first national cancer control plan and gained funding for it. The Canadian Partnership Against Cancer began operations in April 2007 with $250 million in government funding. It was created with an initial five year mandate to implement their strategy, as well as to assess whether this model was effective in improving cancer control in Canada.

Since 2007, the Partnership has helped to collect population-based stage data for the four most common cancers and improve the quality of life for cancer patients and their families. It has also worked to improve culturally relevant cancer control initiatives for First Peoples.

The Partnership's second five-year mandate began April 1, 2012. It focuses on the cancer control community's shared priorities for 2012–2017 as documented in the organization's strategic plan, "Sustaining Action Toward a Shared Vision."

== Leadership ==
Chair

The chair of the Board of Directors is Chris Power, President and CEO of Capital District Health Authority in Halifax. The board of directors is made up of representatives from cancer organizations, provincial and territorial governments, the federal government and Canadian aboriginals.

CEO

The Chief Executive Officer is Shelly Jamieson, who joined the Partnership in July 2012. Jamieson was Head of the Ontario Public Service and Clerk of the Executive Council. She was also Deputy Minister of Transportation for the province of Ontario.

== Sources ==
- Prime Minister announces Canadian Partnership Against Cancer. 24 November 2006
- CPAC corporate website
- The Canadian Strategy for Cancer Control. July 2006
- Sustaining Action Towards A Shared Vision: 2007-2012 Strategic Plan
