= National Cancer Registrars Association =

The National Cancer Registrars Association (NCRA), formerly National Tumor Registrars Association, is a not-for-profit association representing cancer registry professionals and Certified Tumor Registrar (CTR) certificants. NCRA's primary focus is education and certification. Worldwide, there are over 5,800 NCRA members and nearly 4,500 CTRs. NCRA provides ongoing training through various mediums including annual conferences, workshops, publications, and their continuing education credit program. NCRA's current advocacy and outreach efforts is the application for a change in the Standard Occupational Classification to the Office of Management and Budget. NCRA is a partner of the Centers for Disease Control and Prevention's National Program of Cancer Registries.

"Cancer registrars are data information specialists that capture a complete history, diagnosis, treatment, and health status for every cancer patient in the U.S. The data provide essential information to researchers, healthcare providers, and public health officials to better monitor and advance cancer treatments, conduct research, and improve cancer prevention and screening programs." These registrars have an average annual salary of $60,000.

== Certified Tumor Registrar (CTR) Certification ==
The Certified Tumor Registrar (CTR) certification examination is administered by NCRA's Council on Certification. NCRA’s Council on Certification promotes standardization in the collection and use of cancer data through examination and certification of Cancer Registrars and other cancer data specialists. The first exam was offered in 1983.

NCRA accredits education programs that offer associate’s degrees and certificates in Cancer Registry Management (CRM) or Cancer Information Management (CIM). The AHIMA CRM Program helps enrollees qualify for the CTR certification exam. It is a web-based program which assists in gaining the following skills:

- Accurately abstract health information into a cancer registry to allow for uniform data collection
- Manage an effective cancer registry program at a local, state or national level
- Produce cancer related information to assist healthcare providers in patient care and research
- Provide information for cancer prevention activities

== Standard Occupational Classification ==
On July 21, 2014, The National Cancer Registrars Association submitted a proposal for a new occupation code for Medical Registrars. The reasoning behind this proposal is because the duties and tasks of actual registrars are more advanced than what the current code and description states. Currently, medical registrars are classified as SOC 29-2071 Medical Records and Health Information Technicians. If this code were to change, the occupation's statistics would be improved and provide a clearer understanding of workforce needs so the positions are not confused with other occupations like medical coders. The SOC is revised every ten years, and the revision is a multi-year process.

== History ==
NCRA was established in 1974 as National Tumor Registrars Association. The first CTR exam was offered in 1983, and in 2003 NCRA took over the exam; it was previously administrated by the National Board for Certification of Registrars.
