= Dropout Prevention Act =

- Enacted by: the 107th United States Congress

Citations
- Statutes at Large: 115 Stat. 1610

Codification
- Titles amended: 20 U.S.C.: Education

The Dropout Prevention Act, also known as Title I, Part H, of the No Child Left Behind Act, is responsible for establishing the school dropout prevention program under the 2002 United States federal education act No Child Left Behind. This part of No Child Left Behind was created to provide schools with support for retention of all students and prevention of dropouts from the most at-risk youth. it was later repealed in 2015

== Overview ==
Statistical research shows that one-third of most American students are labeled as at-risk for academic failure, with dropping out of school being the main result of this failure. It is estimated that 2 million American students drop out of high school each year. The US Department of Education assesses the dropout rate by calculating the percentage of 16- to 24-year-olds who are not currently enrolled in school and who have not yet earned a high school credential. For example, the high school dropout rate of the United States in 2022 was 5.3%.

The Dropout Prevention Act was, like No Child Left Behind, based on scientifically based research (SBR). This research is monitored by The US Department of Education, Office of the Inspector General.

This particular grant program provides funding to State Education Agency, and/or the local school districts. These funds are used for research-based and coordinated school dropout prevention programs for students in grades 6–12. This research-based approach is a major component of No Child Left Behind. The specific grants are used for the support of programs such as: professional development, reduction of teacher-student ratios, counseling for at-risk students, and mentor programs for those same at-risk students.

Finally, the act provided that the US Department of Education would create a national recognition program to identify schools that have been effective in lowering their dropout rates.

== Implementation ==
The grants that come from this act are awarded for up to 60 months to local education agencies (LEA's) and state education agencies (SEA's) to support those agencies in student dropout prevention and reentry efforts for students that have dropped out. These grants can be used for the following:

- The early and continued identification of students at risk of not graduating.
- Identifying and encouraging youth who have left school without graduating to reenter and graduate.
- Implementing other comprehensive approaches.
- Implementing transition programs to help the successful transition from middle school to high school.

An example of one program that was used as a model is the Project Success Program that was implemented at Bainbridge High School in Georgia. Students that enroll in the program are/have:

- typically economically disadvantaged.
- scored below the 25th percentile on a standardized test.
- received a grade of “D” or below in a vocational class.
- in need of support services.

The Project Success initiative focuses on student advancement in a vocational field, while also remediating any deficiencies that the student has in reading, mathematics, or language.

Due to lack of funding, during the years 2007–2009, the Department of Education issued regulations that allowed states, school districts, and individual schools to eliminate accountability for graduation rate, and allowed them to cease reporting of the graduation rate for minority students.

== Repeal ==
=== Adequate Yearly Progress (AYP) ===
In accordance with ESSA, there were dramatic changes introduced in the NCLB Act in terms of accountability issues as almost all traces of federal involvement into this sphere were removed and full control over accountability system implementation remained with the states.

==== Highly Qualified Teachers ====
"Highly qualified teacher" requirement was removed from ESSA legislation despite the fact that states and districts continue collecting the necessary data concerning the issue and report on disproportional allocation of such teachers among low-income and minority children in particular.

===== Standardized Testing =====
One of the major criticisms directed towards NCLB Act was the fact that it had an extremely punitive nature due to numerous requirements and sanctions introduced in the event of failure to provide adequate performance results on the basis of student tests. In connection with ESSA legislation, all measures related to "Adequate Yearly Progress" along with sanctions, such as possible closure, became invalid. Moreover, ESSA eliminated federal involvement into teacher evaluation procedures.

====== Equity & Achievement Gaps ======
ESSA shifted policymaking authority back to states and local districts, but critics worry that the decrease in federal control may negatively impact equal educational opportunity and limit the federal government's ability to impose consequences on states for student performance.
