= CoVLP =

COVID-19 vaccine candidate produced in a plant

Vaccine description
- Target: SARS-CoV-2
- Vaccine type: Virus-like particles

Clinical data
- Trade names: Covifenz
- Routes of administration: Intramuscular

Legal status
- Legal status: CA: ℞-only

Identifiers
- CAS Number: 2698316-96-8
- DrugBank: DB15852

CoVLP (brand name Covifenz) was a COVID-19 vaccine developed by Medicago in Canada and GlaxoSmithKline (GSK). The product and Medicago, Inc. were owned by Mitsubishi, who terminated the company and program in February 2023 due to high international market competition for COVID-19 vaccines.

It is a coronavirus virus-like particle vaccine grown in the Australian weed, Nicotiana benthamiana.

The Medicago method to manufacture CoVLP was a "molecular farming" technology regarded as rapid, low-cost, and safe. It was proposed specifically for production of COVID-19 vaccines.

In February 2022, Health Canada authorized use of CoVLP for preventing COVID-19 infection in adults 18 to 64 years old. The authorization stated there was an efficacy rate of 71% after two vaccinations against symptoms of COVID-19 disease and 100% efficacy against severe COVID-19 infections.

== Efficacy ==
On 7 December 2021, Medicago-GSK announced a preliminary analysis showing an overall efficacy of 71%, with 75% against the Delta variant and 89% efficacy against Gamma.

== Pharmacology ==
CoVLP is an example of a virus-like particle vaccine, consisting of a molecular complex which closely resembles a virus, but is non-infectious because it contains no viral genetic material. It uses recombinant spike proteins derived from SARS-CoV-2.

== Manufacturing ==
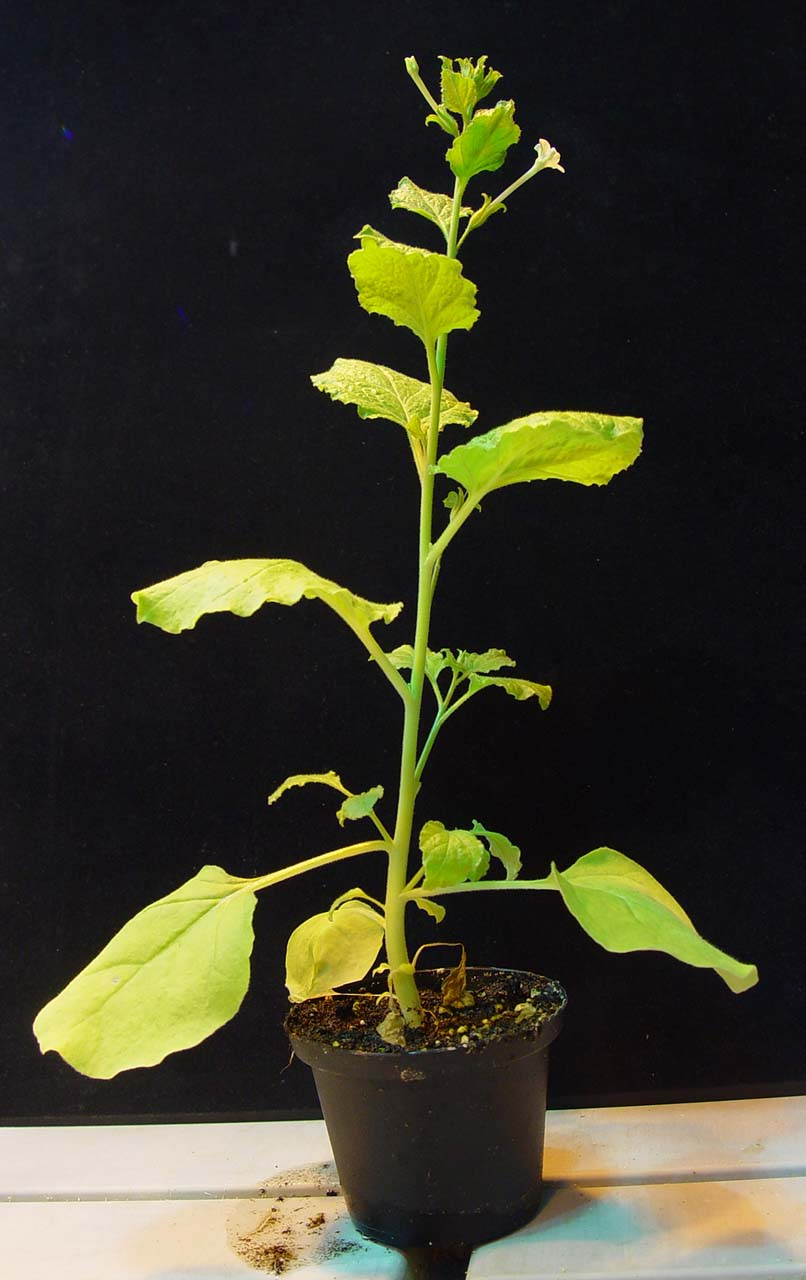
N. benthamiana plant used by Medicago as a "minifactory" for rapid production of coVLP

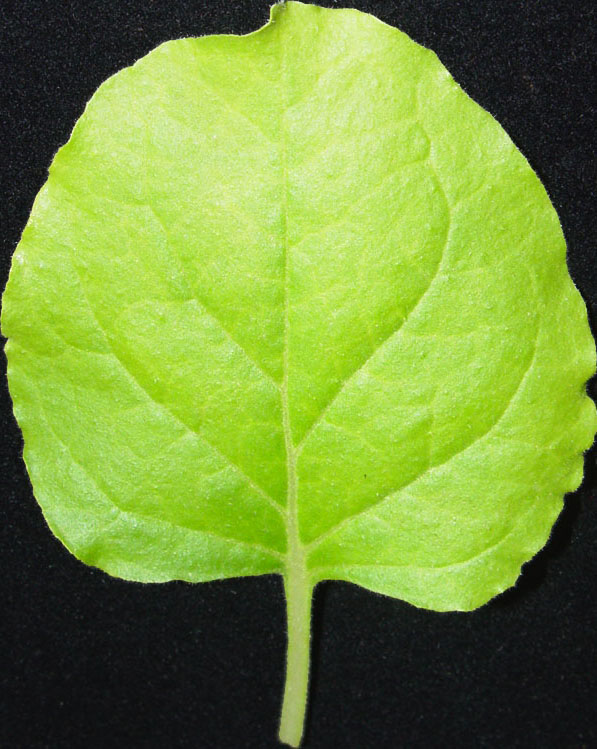
Nicotiana benthamiana, leaf

The virus-like particles are produced by creating a bacterium engineered with genes of the virus, then introducing the bacteria into Nicotiana benthamiana plants. The plants take up the bacteria virus-derived genetic material, producing in its leaves the virus-like particles, which are then harvested and extracted.

In use since the 1990s, the method of using a plant like N. benthamiana has been called "molecular farming" or a "plant-based factory", having vaccine manufacturing advantages of rapid, low-cost production of proteins, large scalability for production, and safety of using plants for pharmaceutical production. It has been proposed specifically for production of COVID-19 vaccines.

== History ==
Medicago started developing the COVID-19 vaccine candidate, CoVLP, in 2020, in collaboration with the governments of Canada and Quebec, using a plant-based vaccine technology with an adjuvant manufactured by GlaxoSmithKline (GSK). The GSK adjuvant is intended to enhance the immune response to CoVLP, reducing the amount of antigen required per dose, thereby facilitating mass production of vaccine doses.

In March 2022, the vaccine was rejected by the World Health Organization due to the tobacco company Philip Morris International owning a stake in Medicago. The UN agency has a strict policy about engagement with the tobacco industry.

In February 2023, Mitsubishi announced the shuttering of Medicago, and with that, the withdrawal of Medicago products from the market, marking the end of coVLP/Covifenz. Mitsubishi had determined that the vaccine was no longer commercially viable, with the changing landscape of the global vaccine marketplace, and demand for the product.

== Society and culture ==
=== Legal status ===
In December 2021, Medicago announced submission of the Phase III results to Health Canada.

In February 2022, Health Canada approved the use of CoVLP for adults aged 18–64 in Canada. The CoVLP vaccine was sold under the brand name Covifenz.

On March 31, 2023, Medicago cancelled their authorization to manufacture Covifenz vaccine.

== Research ==
=== Phase I ===
Beginning in August 2020, CoVLP was in a Phase I clinical trial at two locations in Quebec to evaluate its safety and immune response. 180 Adults (18–55 years) were randomized at two sites in Quebec, Canada, to receive two intramuscular doses of CoVLP (3.75 μg, 7.5 μg, and 15 μg) 21 d apart, alone or adjuvanted with AS03 or CpG1018. All formulations were well tolerated, and adverse events after vaccination were generally mild to moderate, transient and highest in the adjuvanted groups. There was no CoVLP dose effect on serum NAbs, but titers increased significantly with both adjuvants. After the second dose, NAbs in the CoVLP + AS03 groups were more than tenfold higher than titers in Coronavirus 2019 convalescent sera. Both spike protein-specific interferon-γ and interleukin-4 cellular responses were also induced. This pre-specified interim analysis supports further evaluation of the CoVLP vaccine candidate.

=== Phase II ===
In November 2020, Medicago-GSK started a Phase II clinical trial for CoVLP with 588 participants. Researchers reported day 42 interim safety 17 and immunogenicity data from a Phase II, randomized, placebo-controlled trial in Adults aged 18+ immunized with a virus-like particle vaccine candidate produced in plants displaying 19 SARS-CoV-2 spike glycoprotein (CoVLP) adjuvanted with AS03 (NCT04636697). This report focused on presenting safety, tolerability and immunogenicity, as measured by 21 neutralizing antibody (NAb) and cell mediated immunity (IFN-γ and IL-4 ELISpot) responses, 22 in Adults aged 18–64 (Adults) and Older Adults aged 65+ (Older Adults).

=== Phase III ===
In April 2021, Medicago-GSK started a Phase III clinical trial for CoVLP, enrolling 30,918 participants in North America, Latin America, and Europe. GSK and Medicago announced the success of the trial on December 7, 2021. According to the analysis of the data presented by Health Canada's National Advisory Committee on Immunization (NACI), CoVLP exhibited 69.5% efficacy against laboratory-confirmed, symptomatic SARS-CoV-2 infection starting at least 7 days after the second dose of the vaccine in the intention-to-treat analysis, even though the trial included some participants who had previously been infected with the virus when the trial began. Additionally, it exhibited 100.0% efficacy against the Alpha variant, 75.3% against the Delta variant, and 88.6% against the Gamma variant in the per-protocol analysis, with "similar" results in the intention-to-treat analysis.
