= APEX Youth Center =

APEX Community Advancement, Inc. (Always Pursuing EXcellence) was a youth center located in Central City New Orleans. The organization targets at risk youths and young adults.

== History ==
APEX started in the home of Lisa Fitzpatrick and Danny Fitzpatrick, when young children and teens came over to play with the couple's two children (now adults), Sean Engel and Ian Fitzpatrick. During the week, children, teens, and young adults would gather at the house to play video games, be served snacks, and eventually participate in Bible study. This family piqued the interest of the young vicar at Gloria Dei Church when he became curious of why 30 people were running in and out of the house. He later approached the Fitzpatrick's and offered a large space in their church fellowship hall. At Gloria Dei Church, APEX officially began and new members were joining daily. During weekends, attendance would be in the 100's, most being under the age of 25.

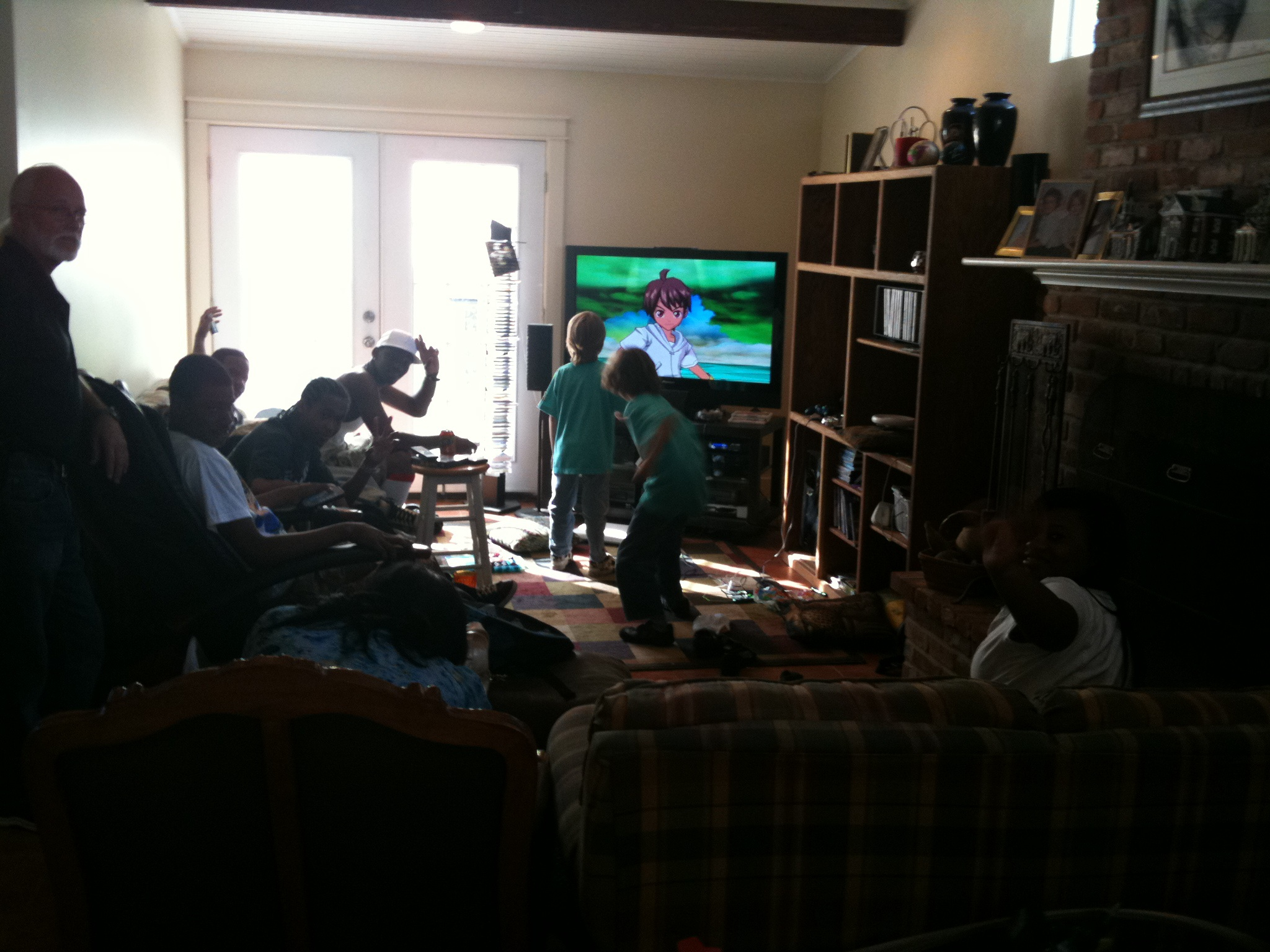
Apex Dance crew and some other youth at the home of the Fitzpatrick's

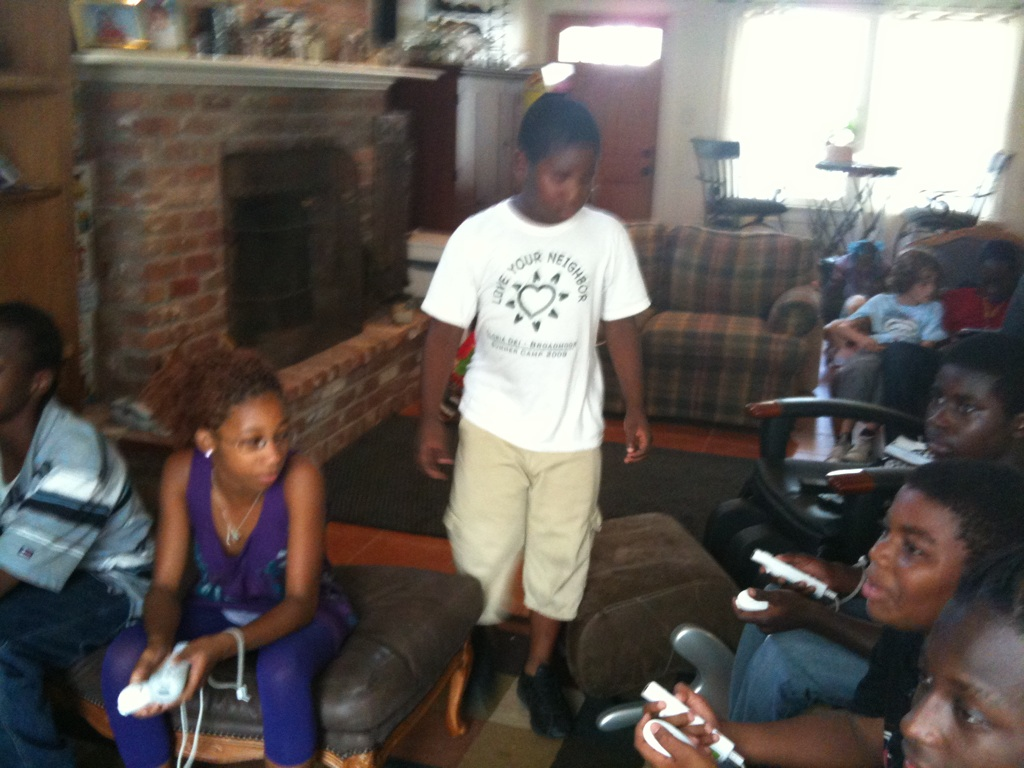
Kids gathering at the Fitzpatrick's pre-APEX

LINC New Orleans, a neighborhood development organization, was introduced to the Fitzpatricks, providing volunteers and guidance, and soon this turned into an every other Saturday community cook-out for any one who wanted to come. The newly growing APEX organization would then move to 'Gloria Dei' church. The organization would continue for a second summer, hosting over 120 young adults and teenagers acting as mentors and junior councillors. It promoted a non-violent theme, called 'Kicking it Old School'.

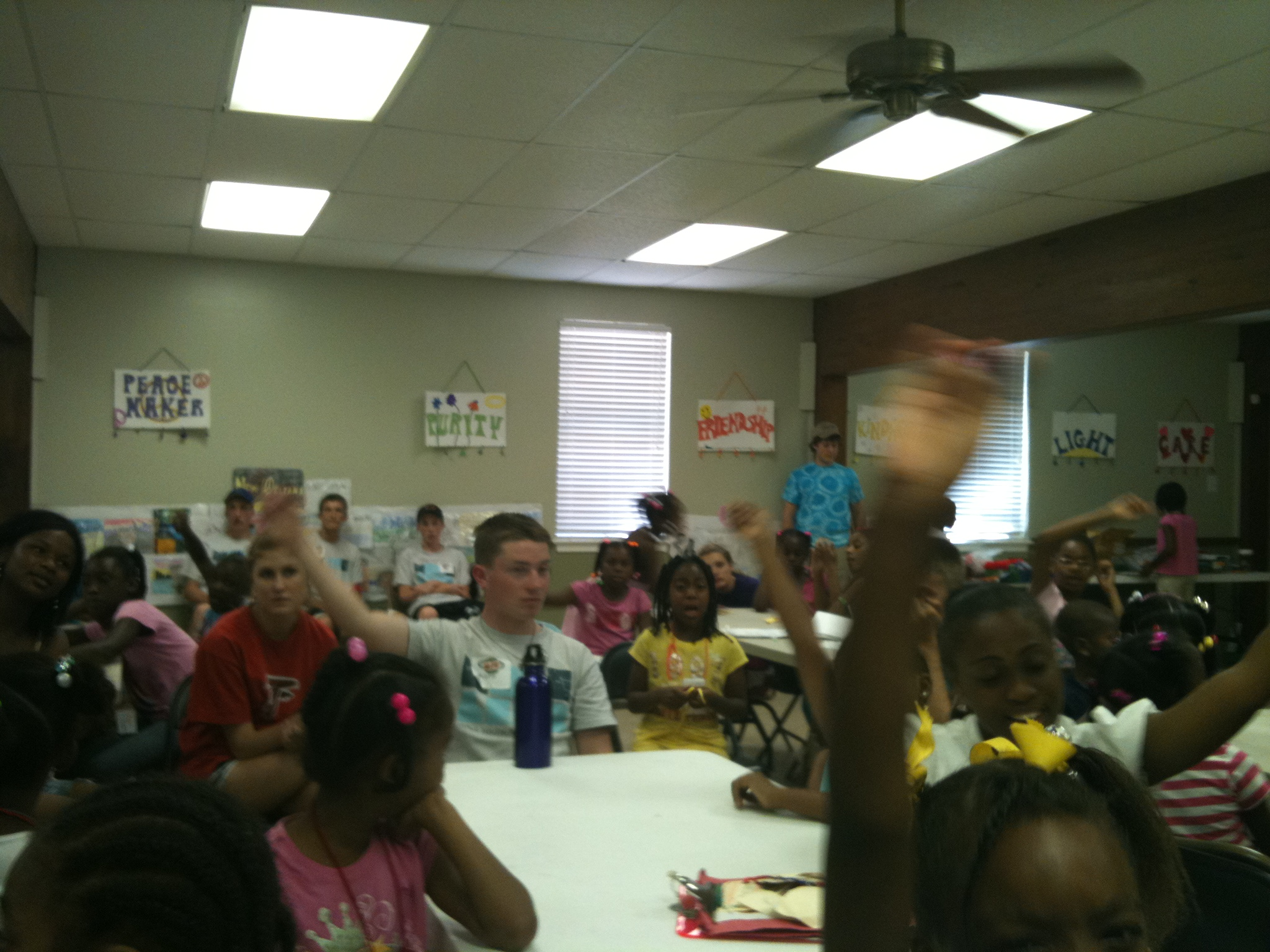
APEX Campers along with some out of town volunteers that came from as far as Chicago.

== Purpose ==
APEX was designed for the purpose of supporting, innovating and creating programs and services focusing on the needs of young people to help better their lives and keep them off the streets of New Orleans, and to create future leaders (or model citizens). The center services children, primarily ages 12 to 18, during the day, with special activities and programs in the evening targeted to teens and young adults between 15 and 25. Volunteers circulate, and facilitate positive social interaction, teaching the necessary verbal and non-verbal communication skills to resolve conflict and develop relationships. Features such as homework help, tutoring, job-training, computer access, non-violent video games, a pool table and indoor and outdoor team sports are highlighted. APEX Youth Center's theme is “Reconciliation, Never Retaliation”.

Since APEX was opened January 2010, it has had over 200 young adult clientele.

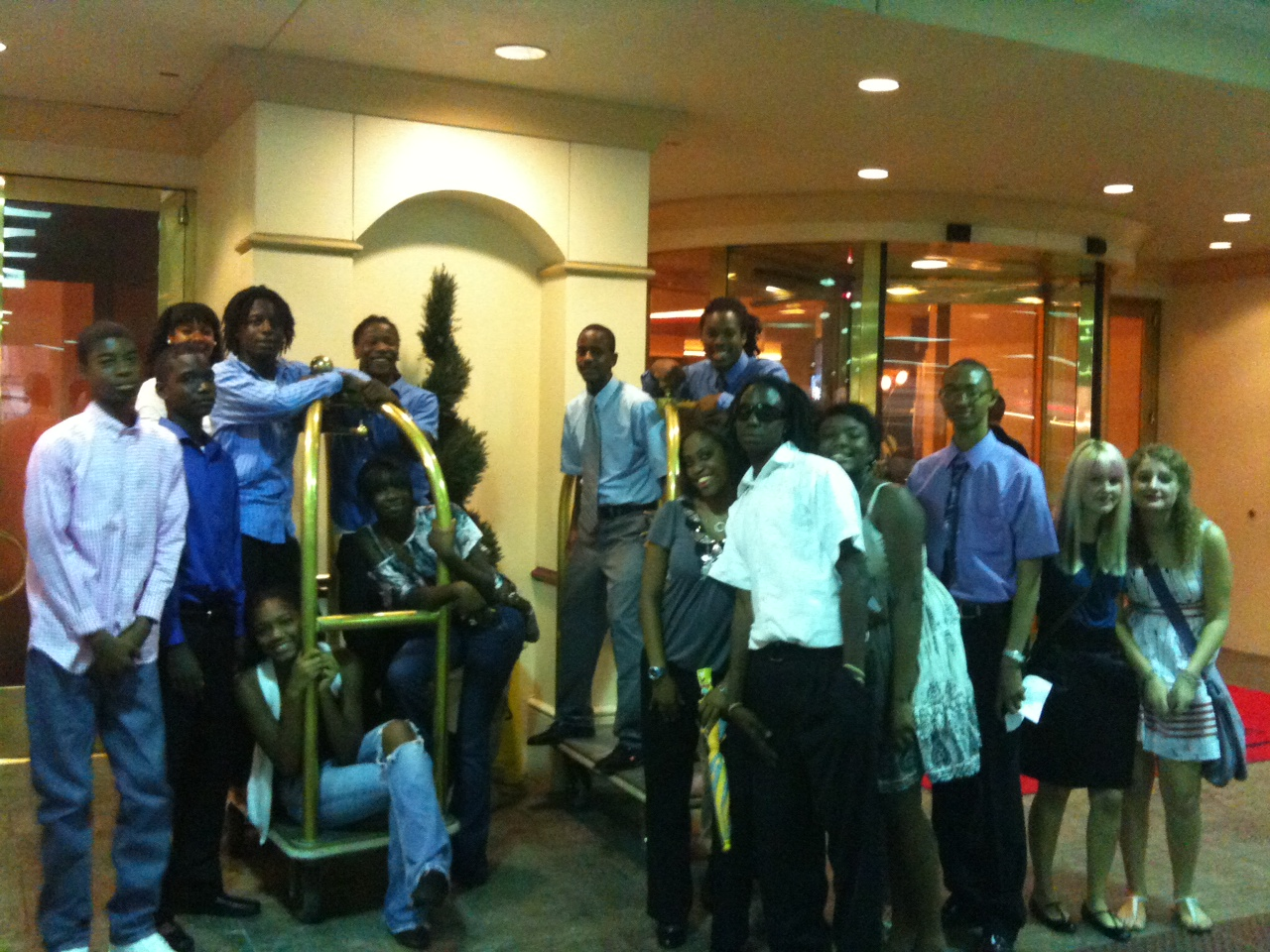
APEX Leadership Council at a Lawyers Association breakfast.
