= Cordell Jeffers =

British motivational speaker

Cordell Jeffers is a motivational speaker, entrepreneur and mindset coach from Birmingham, United Kingdom. He is an ambassador of The King's Trust charity. In 2022, Jeffers delivered a TEDx talk entitled "How To Turn Your Pain Into Purpose," in TedxMoseley event.

== Biography ==
Jeffers was born and grew up in Stechford, Birmingham. Due to dyslexia he became disengaged in secondary school, leading to his expulsion. Following this, he relocated to the Caribbean with his mother and brother to live with his grandparents in Saint Kitts and Nevis and there he completed his secondary school education.

At the age of 15, Jeffers returned to live with his aunt in Nechells, Birmingham and pursued further education, eventually studying business and marketing at Manchester Metropolitan University. During this time, he engaged in online retail activities.

He started his first business, Mungo Sports, a sportswear brand, With support from the Prince's Trust Enterprise programme, and began conducting workshops in schools on creative design and entrepreneurship. He also established We Shine Together, a social enterprise offering training programs to individuals from disadvantaged communities, this initiative reportedly provided schooling support to over 30 teenagers from Nepal, Zimbabwe and India. As a motivational speaker, Jeffers shares his personal life and challenges at various events and educational institutions. In February 2022, Jeffers delivered a TEDx talk titled "How To Turn Your Pain Into Purpose," where he discussed mindset and personal development.

In recognition of his work, Jeffers was appointed as The Prince's Trust ambassador and was awarded The Watches of Switzerland Group Young Change Maker award from King Charles III during Prince's Trust awards at St James Palace in London. As a charity ambassador he has reportedly supported over 5,000 black and ethnic students through training and school workshops.
