= Attrition (research) =

Ratios regarding the loss of participants during an experiment

In science, attrition are ratios regarding the loss of participants during an experiment. Attrition rates are values that indicate the participant drop out. Higher attrition rates are found in longitudinal studies.

== See also ==
- Churn rate
- Dropping out
- Intention-to-treat analysis
- Selection bias § Attrition
