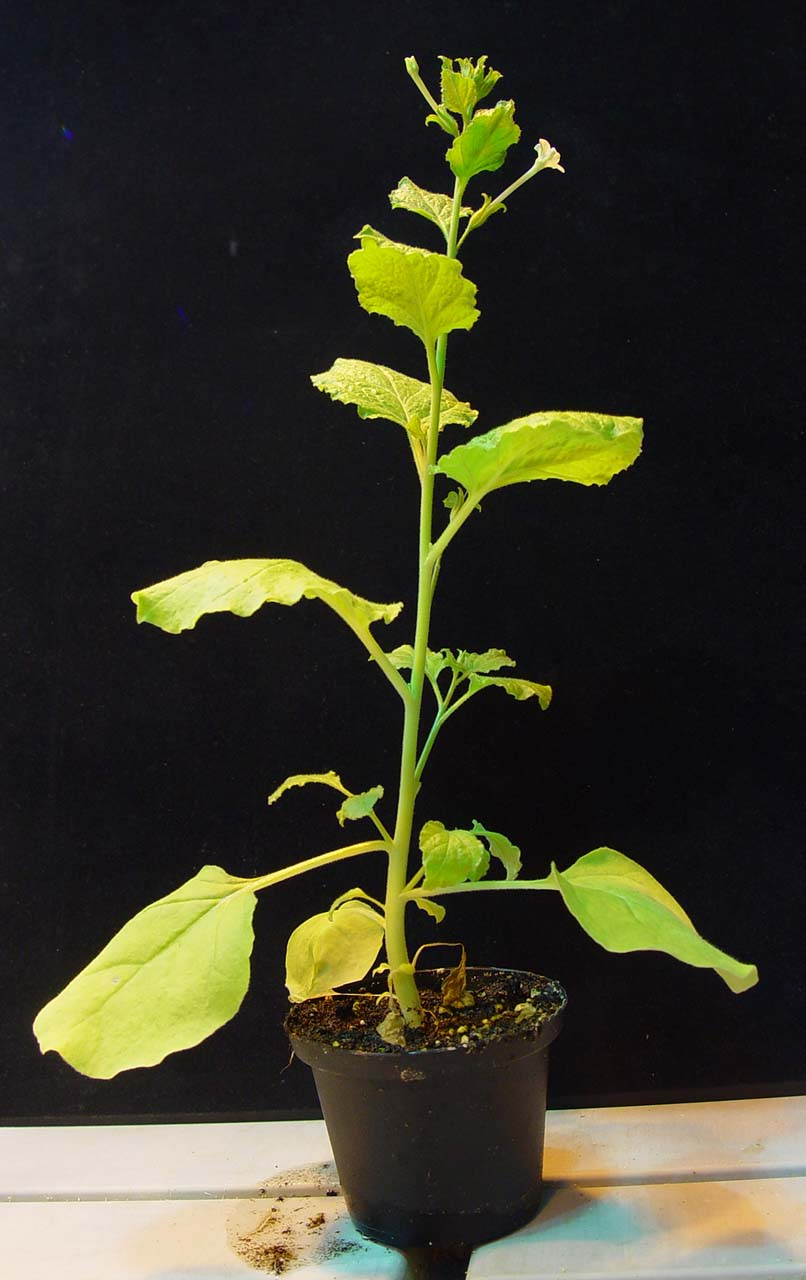

Scientific classification
- Kingdom: Plantae
- Clade: Tracheophytes
- Clade: Angiosperms
- Clade: Eudicots
- Clade: Asterids
- Order: Solanales
- Family: Solanaceae
- Genus: Nicotiana
- Species: N. benthamiana

Binomial name
- Nicotiana benthamiana Domin

= Nicotiana benthamiana =

Species of flowering plant

Nicotiana benthamiana, colloquially known as benth or benthi, is a species of Nicotiana indigenous to Australia. It is a close relative of tobacco.

A synonym for this species is Nicotiana suaveolens var. cordifolia, a description given by George Bentham in Flora Australiensis in 1868. This was transferred to Nicotiana benthamiana by Karel Domin in Bibliotheca Botanica (1929), honoring the original author in the specific epithet.

== History ==
The plant was used by people of Australia as a stimulant, containing nicotine and other alkaloids, before the introduction of commercial tobacco (N. tabacum and N. rustica). Indigenous names for it include tjuntiwari and muntju. It was first collected on the north coast of Australia by Benjamin Bynoe on a voyage of HMS Beagle in 1837.

== Description ==
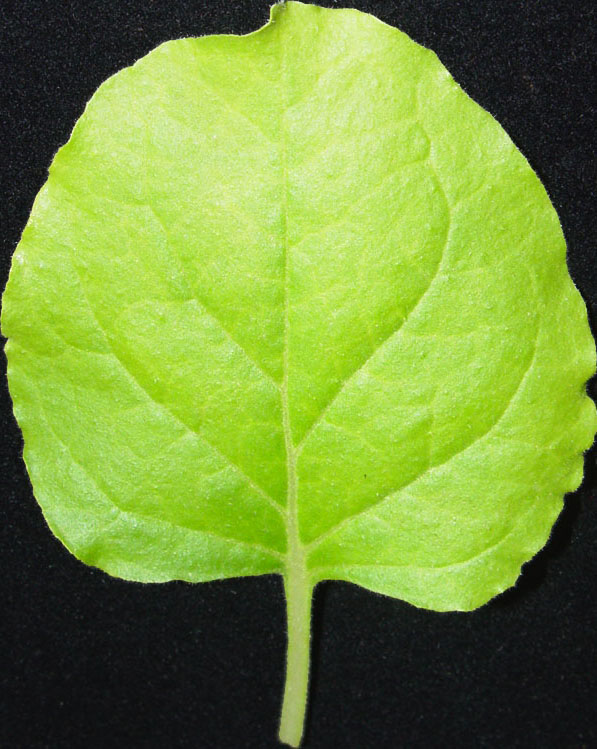
Nicotiana benthamiana, leaf

The herbaceous plant is found amongst rocks on hills and cliffs throughout the northern regions of Australia. Variable in height and habit, the species may be erect and up to 1.5 metres (59.1 in) or sprawling out no taller than 200 millimetres (7.9 in). The flowers are white.

== Research uses ==
Nicotiana benthamiana has been used as a model organism in plant research. For example, the leaves are rather frail and can be injured in experiments to study ethylene synthesis. Ethylene is a plant hormone which is secreted, among other situations, after injuries. Using gas chromatography, the quantity of ethylene emitted can be measured. Due to the large number of plant pathogens able to infect it, N. benthamiana is widely used in the field of plant virology. It is also an excellent target plant for agroinfiltration.

Nicotiana benthamiana has a number of wild strains across Australia, and the laboratory strain is an extremophile originating from a population that has retained a loss-of-function mutation in Rdr1 (RNA-dependent RNA polymerase 1), rendering it hypersusceptible to viruses.

=== Biotechnology ===
Nicotiana benthamiana is also a common plant used for "pharming" of monoclonal antibodies and other recombinant proteins; for example, the drug ZMapp was produced using these plants.

=== Genetically modified organism ===
==== Cocaine ====
In 2022, a genetically engineered N. benthamiana was developed that was able to produce 4% of the amount of cocaine found in a coca plant.

==== Psychedelic tryptamines ====
Nicotiana benthamiana was engineered to produce five psychedelic tryptamines, including psilocin, psilocybin, dimethyltryptamine (DMT), bufotenin, and 5-MeO-DMT, in 2026. In addition, it was modified to produce certain halogenated tryptamines as well.

=== COVID-19 vaccine development ===
The Quebec City-based biotechnology company, Medicago Inc., used N. benthamiana as a "factory" to produce virus-like particles over short incubation periods (days) and in high volume, enabling rapid manufacturing capability for a potential COVID-19 vaccine.

In February 2022, Health Canada authorised use of the COVID-19 vaccine called CoVLP (brand name Covifenz) developed from N. benthamiana for preventing infection in adults 18 to 64 years old.
