= Medicago Inc. =

Canadian biotechnology company

- Company type: Private
- Industry: Biotechnology
- Founded: 1999
- Founder: Louis-Philippe Vézina
- Defunct: 2023
- Headquarters: Quebec City, Quebec, Canada
- Key people: Toshifumi Tada (President & CEO)
- Website: medicago.com (archived)

Medicago Inc. was a Canadian biotechnology company focused on the discovery, development, and commercialization of virus-like particles using plants as bioreactors to produce proteins, candidate vaccines, and medications. By using live plant leaves as hosts in the discovery and manufacturing process, the Medicago "Proficia" technology intended to create a rapid, high-yield system for its product candidates. Privately owned by a subsidiary of Mitsubishi Tanabe Pharma, Medicago and its product development programs were terminated by Mitsubishi in February 2023.

The main clinical targets for Medicago product candidates were antiviral vaccines and antibody therapeutics. The company's name was derived from the Latin word for alfalfa, which was the first plant the company used to develop its technologies. Medicago technologies evolved from research at the Laval University and Agriculture and Agri-Food Canada in the 1990s.

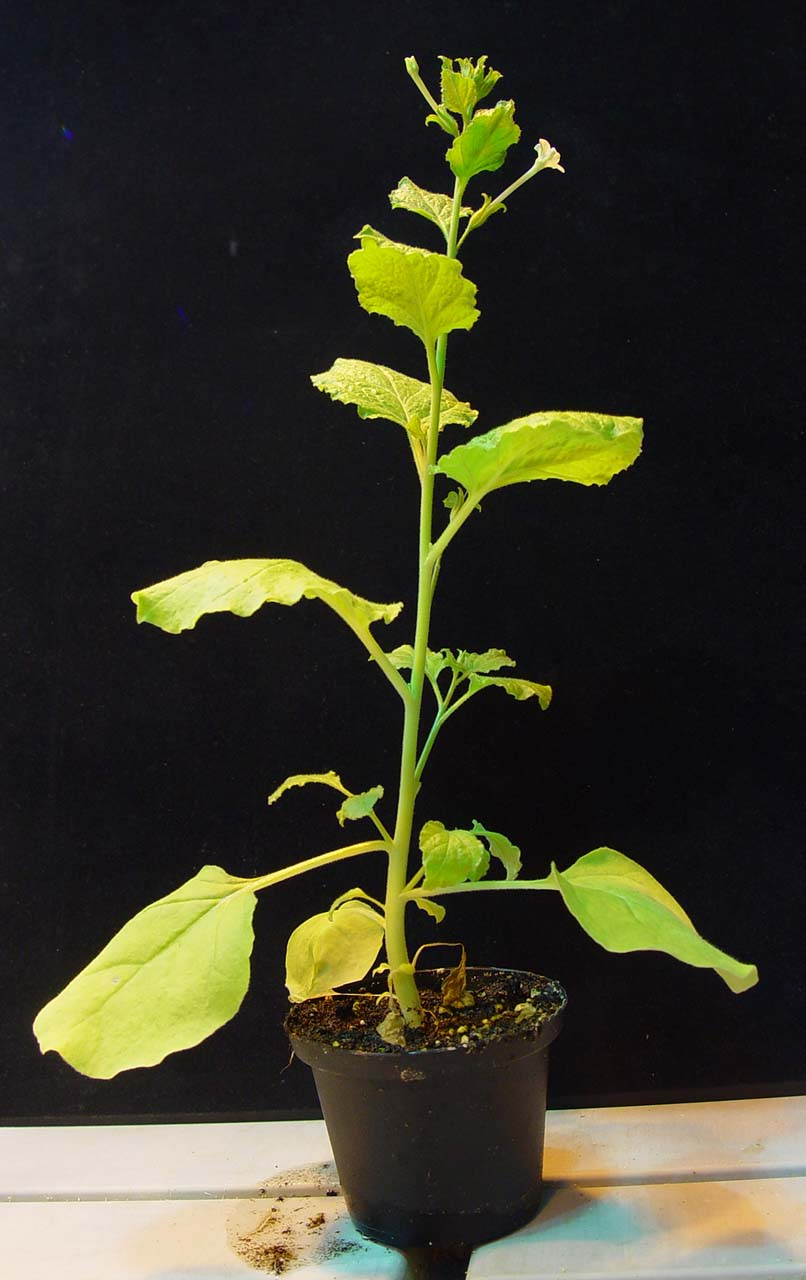
N. benthamiana plant used by Medicago as a "minifactory" for rapid production of VLPs for a potential COVID-19 vaccine

== History ==
A research partnership was formed between Laval University and Agriculture Canada in 1997. This would go on to be incorporated in 1999 as Medicago, licensing that technology researched in the partnership, from Agriculture Canada and Université Laval.

In September 2013, Philip Morris International acquired a 40% stake in Medicago, the remaining 60% being acquired by Mitsubishi Tanabe Pharma Corporation and other Mitsubishi Group companies, in a joint purchase.

The company had a Phase III clinical trial underway in 2020 for its candidate to prevent seasonal influenza.

For its COVID-19 vaccine, Medicago grew its virus-like particles in the Australian weed, Nicotiana benthamiana. In July 2020, the company began a Phase I clinical trial on its candidate vaccine for COVID-19 disease, coVLP, which advanced to a Phase II-III trial in Canada and the United States during November 2020. The Canadian government invested $173 million into Medicago to support development of the Covifenz vaccine and help expand its production facility. In December 2021, the company announced that its CoVLP vaccine candidate exhibited 71% efficacy and no adverse effects in a multinational, Phase III clinical trial. In February 2022, Health Canada authorized use of CoVLP (brand name Covifenz) for preventing COVID-19 infection in adults 18 to 64 years old.

In July 2022, the Canadian federal government determined it would not consider buying the shares owned by Medicago's parent company, tobacco company Philip Morris International, to overcome the problem of the World Health Organization accepting any products from tobacco concerns.

In December 2022, Philip Morris was bought out by Mitsubishi, acquiring a 100% stake in the company.

=== Termination ===
In February 2023, Mitsubishi Chemical Corporation decided to shut down the company due to the changing landscape of COVID-19 vaccines and the marketplace, and the low commercial prospects of the company.

== Technology ==
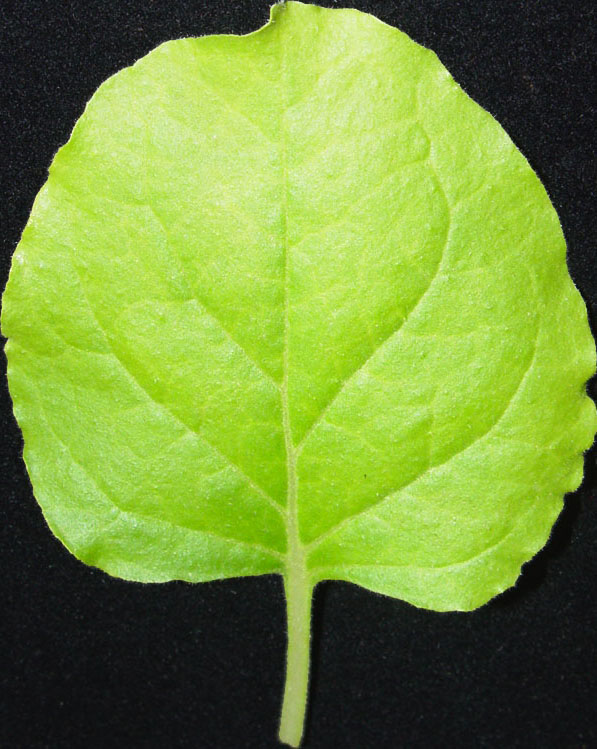
Nicotiana benthamiana, leaf

The Medicago technology used plants as bioreactors to produce proteins for vaccine and protein-based therapeutic candidates. The plant-based production platform was intended to be accurate and rapid to shorten product development time and prevent the risk of mutation.

Medicago used its proprietary Proficia technology, which is a possible alternative to traditional egg-based methods for producing virus-like particles (VLPs) used to manufacture vaccine candidates. Typically, licensed influenza vaccines are manufactured using embryonated chicken eggs. With living plants as hosts, Proficia technology used VLP production as antigens in plant leaves, providing a flexible, high-yield system with potential to produce test material within the growth period of plants (one month).

The steps of the technology are:

1. synthesis – VLP genes are produced from a known viral sequence, requiring no live virus;
2. infiltration – using a vacuum infiltration method, the VLP genes are introduced into plant leaves;
3. incubation – the plants containing the genetic material are incubated over days in specific chambers for protein production to grow VLPs;
4. harvest – leaves are collected then processed to extract VLPs;
5. purification – clinical-grade material is purified to prepare for human testing.

VLPs serve as potential vaccines by mimicking the natural structure and function of viruses, enabling recognition by the immune system. However, by absence of the main virus genetic material, VLPs are non-infectious and unable to replicate like a virus does in vivo, thereby evoking an immune response similar to a natural infection, but without the associated illnesses.

== COVID-19 vaccine ==
The lead COVID-19 vaccine candidate, CoVLP, by Medicago, was a coronavirus VLP grown in the Australian weed, Nicotiana benthamiana.

Medicago was developing the COVID-19 vaccine candidate in collaboration with the governments of Canada and Quebec, and by using an adjuvant manufactured by GlaxoSmithKline.

=== Phase I research ===
As of August 2020, the Medicago vaccine candidate was being evaluated for safety, toxicity, and immune response in a Phase I clinical trial at two locations in Quebec. In October 2020, the Government of Canada awarded Medicago a contract of up to $173 million to advance the company's COVID-19 vaccine candidate.

=== Phase II-III research ===
In November 2020, Medicago-GSK started Phase II-III clinical trials for their COVID-19 vaccine candidate.

As of January 2021, the Phase III trial was enrolling participants toward the total goal of 30,612, with each volunteer receiving two injections 21 days apart in an amount of 3.75 micrograms of CoVLP each time. The Phase III study is scheduled to conclude in April 2022. In December 2021, the CoVLP candidate showed 71% efficacy and safety in preliminary results from the Phase III trial.

=== Authorization ===
In February 2022, Medicago and GlaxoSmithKline received authorization for CoVLP from Health Canada as an approved vaccine for preventing COVID-19 infection in adults 18 to 64 years old. The brand name for CoVLP is Covifenz.

In March 2022, the first Canadian-made COVID-19 vaccine produced by Medicago was rejected by the World Health Organization due to the tobacco company Philip Morris International owning a stake in the company. The UN agency has a strict policy about engagement with the tobacco industry.

=== Withdrawal and corporate termination ===
Due to substantial competition in the global vaccine market and low demand for Covifenz, Mitsubishi announced in February 2023 that Covifenz and Medicago, Inc. would be terminated.

== Aramis Biotechnologies ==
Aramis Biotechnologies was set up as a successor company to Medicago during 2023, acquiring intellectual property and equipment, in agreement with Mitsubishi Chemical Group.

== See also ==
- COVID-19 pandemic
- 2009 flu pandemic vaccine
