= Analysis of clinical trials =

Clinical trials are medical research studies conducted on human subjects. The human subjects are assigned to one or more interventions, and the investigators evaluate the effects of those interventions. The progress and results of clinical trials are analyzed statistically.

== Analysis factors ==
=== Intention to treat ===
Randomized clinical trials analyzed by the intention-to-treat (ITT) approach provide fair comparisons among the treatment groups because it avoids the bias associated with the non-random loss of the participants. The basic ITT principle is that participants in the trials should be analysed in the groups to which they were randomized, regardless of whether they received or adhered to the allocated intervention. However, medical investigators often have difficulties in accepting ITT analysis because of clinical trial issues like missing data or adherence to protocol.

=== Per protocol ===
This analysis can be restricted to only the participants who fulfill the protocol in terms of the eligibility, adherence to the intervention, and outcome assessment. This analysis is known as an "on-treatment" or "per protocol" analysis. A per-protocol analysis represents a "best-case scenario" to reveal the effect of the drug being studied. However, by restricting the analysis to a selected patient population, it does not show all effects of the new drug. Further, adherence to treatment may be affected by other factors that influence the outcome. Accordingly, per-protocol effects are at risk of bias, whereas the intent-to-treat estimate is not.

== Handling missing data ==
=== Last observation carried forward ===
One method of handling missing data is simply to impute, or fill in, values based on existing data. A standard method to do this is the Last-Observation-Carried-Forward (LOCF) method.

The LOCF method allows for the analysis of the data. However, recent research shows that this method gives a biased estimate of the treatment effect and underestimates the variability of the estimated result. As an example, assume that there are 8 weekly assessments after the baseline observation. If a patient drops out of the study after the third week, then this value is "carried forward" and assumed to be his or her score for the 5 missing data points. The assumption is that the patients improve gradually from the start of the study until the end, so that carrying forward an intermediate value is a conservative estimate of how well the person would have done had he or she remained in the study. The advantages to the LOCF approach are that:

- It minimises the number of the subjects who are eliminated from the analysis, and
- It allows the analysis to examine the trends over time, rather than focusing simply on the endpoint.

However, the National Academy of Sciences, in an advisory report to the Food and Drug Administration on missing data in clinical trials, recommended against the uncritical use of methods like LOCF, stating that "Single imputation methods like last observation carried forward and baseline observation carried forward should not be used as the primary approach to the treatment of missing data unless the assumptions that underlie them are scientifically justified."

=== Multiple imputation methods ===
The National Academy of Sciences advisory panel instead recommended methods that provide valid type I error rates under explicitly stated assumptions taking missing data status into account, and the use of multiple imputation methods based on all the data available in the model. It recommended more widespread use of Bootstrap and Generalized estimating equation methods whenever the assumptions underlying them, such as Missing at Random for GEE methods, can be justified. It advised collecting auxiliary data believed to be associated with dropouts to provide more robust and reliable models, collecting information about reason for drop-out; and, if possible, following up on drop-outs and obtaining efficacy outcome data. Finally, it recommended sensitivity analyses as part of clinical trial reporting to assess the sensitivity of the results to the assumptions about the missing data mechanism.

While the methods recommended by the National Academy of Science report are more recently developed, more robust, and will work under a wider variety of conditions than single-imputation methods like LOCF, no known method for handling missing data is valid under all conditions. As the 1998 International Conference on Harmonization E9 Guidance on Statisticial Principles for Clinical Trials noted, "Unfortunately, no universally applicable methods of handling missing values can be recommended." Expert statistical and medical judgment must select the method most appropriate to the particularly trial conditions of the available imperfect techniques, depending on the particular trial's goals, endpoints, statistical methods, and context.

== Estimands ==
To promote better consistency between a trial's objective and analysis methods, addendum to the ICH E9 guidance on statistical principles for clinical trials (ICH E9(R1)) describes a framework for using estimands; an estimand is a clear description of the treatment effect a trial aims to quantify. According to the ICH E9(R1) addendum, defining an estimand involves detailing the following five attributes: (i) population of patients; (ii) treatment conditions; (iii) the endpoint; (iv) the summary measure; and (v) how intercurrent events are handle.

There has been a growing recognition in literature that different analysis methods can be used to target different estimands. It is therefore important to consider analysis methods that target the chosen estimand and assess if these methods have the most realistic assumptions given the trial’s setting. A tutorial paper on how to implement the estimand framework is available.
