= Disengagement from education =

Lack of inclusion or participation in school activities

Disengagement from education refers to a situation where a person does not feel included, does not participate in school activities, are not enrolled, or have poor school attendance. Disengagement from school is linked to individual attitudes or values and can be influenced by peers, family members, the community, the media, and surrounding cultural aspects in general, including the school itself. In the case of girls, specific circumstances contribute to them dropping out of school, such as teenage pregnancy, classroom practices, poverty, illness or death in the family, early marriage, sexual harassment, and peer pressure.

== Background ==
Out of school rate, 2000–2017 and projections to 2030

Disengagement from school creates barriers for the youth. School is related not only to the future of a young person, as a resource for upward mobility and a higher quality of life, but also to the person's current well-being. When disengaged from the educational system, young people become disconnected and isolated, they feel worthless and incapable of contributing in significant ways in the different domains of their lives such as the family, community or at the national level.

When there is no engagement with school and young people drop out, they become the target of exclusion, not only because of barriers to fostering their skills or reduced chances of finding a formal job, but because they will also likely become victims of prejudice that will construct them as people with deficiencies in their skills and knowledge.

== Socio-cultural factors ==
=== Education of girls ===
According to studies, post-basic education is significant for girls and women, but face challenges and difficult choices to continue with schooling. Many factors influence young women's engagement with the school system, including financial barriers, cultural beliefs, and marital status.

Despite in schools girls and boys are given equal opportunities, there are some factors that affect female students that lead them to disengage from education. Reasons for the disengagement from education by girls are poverty, early marriage, teenage pregnancy, harmful traditional practices like initiation rites, and gender-based violence. Statistics from UIS show that, in Namibia, girls are less likely to drop out of secondary school than boys (girls 21% compared to boys 23%). However, in Malawi there are differences between the dropout rates of boys and girls from secondary school (71% female and 66% male).

In Zimbabwe and Zambia, the dropout rates for female and male students are the same. Studies showed that early marriage is the principal reason for girls’ disengagement, along with financial limitations. In Malawi 50% of girls are married by the age of 18, whilst in Zambia 41% of the girls are married before they reach 18. Child marriage rates in Zimbabwe are at 34% and in Namibia there are low at 7%. In Malawi, studies noted that when girls came back from initiation ceremonies they would have missed several weeks of school and some were unlikely to return to school. In Zimbabwe, boys, especially those from Xhosa origin, missed school whilst attending initiation rites. Traditional gender roles also affect young women.

=== Economic situation ===
Financial difficulties that young people and their families face are major barriers when considering attending school. Although primary education is free in several countries, students are also expected to pay for their school supplies, including books and transport to school. This is related to ethnicity, the rural-urban gap and gender, and produce inequalities. Studies show that, in South Africa, financial barriers is the main obstacle to continuing education for black young people.

According to The World Bank, geographic inequalities are barriers for education in the world, and are associated with economic disparities stating that people living in poverty are ten times less likely to attend school than their richer counterparts. The price of post-basic education is a challenge for many students. Fees, even at the lower amount, pose a burden to families who struggle to raise enough money to send their children to secondary school.

=== Disadvantaged communities, schools and youth ===
Studies show that HIV and AIDS also affect the enrollment of students and the recruitment of teachers in sub-Saharan Africa. This has a negative impact in the quality of education and poses a threat to progress. It reduces the number of teachers and students due to virus-related deaths, and delays efficiency because teaching and learning become more difficult for infected teachers and students. In addition, there is a large number of young orphans in the region who lack reliable parental care. This affects their possibility to attend school and complete education.

Poor performance by students from disadvantaged schools traps marginalized groups in perpetual poverty. The poor performance of students is attributed to poor infrastructure and inadequate learning materials.

=== Families and communities ===
The perception families may have of education has a negative impact on the uptake of secondary school by young people. Parents tend to encourage children who excel academically and demotivate children who score lower marks. Families that do not offer any support, causes individuals to disengage from education.

The breakdown of the family unit is also a reason of youth disengagement from education. Divorce, death and migration of parents are reasons education is interrupted. Divorce and death may change the financial status of the family, and the educational needs of the children could not be met due to dwindling incomes.

In cases of migration, though the financial situation of a family may have improved, children lacked emotional support and parental motivation. In the absence of parental motivation and support, young people are left to manage on their own the challenges that arise during puberty, and are thus more vulnerable to peer pressure.

=== Culture and religion ===
Cultural and religious practices affect both the education of boys and girls. Studies show that it is not only traditional cultural practices that affect young people's education, but also the growth of rural-urban migration which has led to the rise of an alternative urban culture that is affecting the youth. Youth behaviour is a reason for youth disengagement from education.

Boys in Malawi as well as some parts of Zambia and Zimbabwe drop out of school to become part of the Nyao. The initiation into Nyao involves staying in a place where the ancestors are buried for a week or longer. These initiation rites in Malawi and Zambia disturbed the education of young boys. Nyao is a cultural practice of Chewa people who are found mainly in Malawi, as well as parts of Zambia, Mozambique and Zimbabwe. Although Nyao is a cultural practice in Zimbabwe it has been commercialized with dancers charging money to put up shows. Boys as young as 13 drop out of school to become part of a group of Nyao dancers.

== Addressing disengagement from education ==
Addressing the causes of non-participation in education and training improves learners' possibilities to engage in the education system and have access to future opportunities. Five elements to consider individuals' engagement with education include:

1. Engaging youth about the relevance of education as actors of change, focusing on strategies and opportunities in stressful environments;
2. Promoting schools and their curricula's connections with the students’ communities, and empowering families in the promotion of education;
3. Improving the education of girls through gender-sensitive policies, engagement with communities, and out-of-school programmes;
4. Elaborating, implementing and evaluating policies and programmes for the education and inclusion of vulnerable and marginalized youth, with the participation of beneficiaries and communities;
5. Developing out-of-school programmes.

== See also ==
- Dropping out
- At-risk students
- Youth unemployment

== Sources ==
This article incorporates text from a free content work. Licensed under CC BY-SA 3.0 IGO. Text taken from Youth and changing realities: perspectives from Southern Africa, UNESCO. UNESCO.
