= Dropping out =

Leaving school before completion

Dropping out refers to leaving high school, college, university or another group for practical reasons, necessities, inability, apathy, or disillusionment with the system from which the individual in question leaves.

== Canada ==
In Canada, most individuals graduate from grade 12 by the age of 18, according to Jason Gilmore who collects data on employment and education using the Labour Force Survey (LFS), the official survey used to collect unemployment data in Canada (2010). Using this tool, assessing educational attainment and school attendance can calculate a dropout rate (Gilmore, 2010). It was found by the LFS that by 2009, one in twelve 20- to 24-year-old adults did not have a high school diploma (Gilmore, 2010). The study also found that men still have higher dropout rates than women, and that students outside of major cities and in the northern territories also have a higher risk of dropping out. Although since 1990 dropout rates have gone down from 20% to a low of 9% in 2010, the rate does not seem to be dropping since this time (2010).

The average Canadian dropout earns $70 less per week than their peers with a high school diploma. Graduates (without post-secondary) earned an average of $621 per week, whereas dropout students earned an average of $551 (Gilmore, 2010).

Even though dropout rates have gone down in the last 20 to 25 years, the concerns of the impact dropping out has on the labour market are very real (Gilmore, 2010). One in four students without a high school diploma who was in the labour market in 2009-2010 had less likelihood of finding a job due to economic downturn (Gilmore, 2010).

In 2018, graduation rates at universities within Canada were as low as 44% (Macleans, 2018). This is almost half of the student population (Macleans, 2018). There tends to be an increase in students dropping-out as a result of feeling disconnected from their school community (Binfet et al., 2016). This is most common with students within their first two years of post-secondary where students will withdraw from their program, or their entire education completely (Binfet et al., 2018). One preventable measure that post-secondary institutions have used within Canada to combat students dropping out is to incorporate animal support programs (Binfet et al., 2016., & Binfet et al., 2018). Allowing students to interact with support dogs and their owners allowed students to feel connected to their peers, school and school community (Binfet et al., 2016., & Binfet et al., 2018).

== United Kingdom ==
In the United Kingdom, a dropout is anyone who leaves school, college or university without either completing their course of study or transferring to another educational institution. Attendance at a school/college/apprenticeship is compulsory until age 18.

Dropout rate benchmarks are set for each higher education institution and monitored by the Higher Education Funding Council for England (HEFCE), the Higher Education Funding Council for Wales (HEFCW) and the Scottish Funding Council (SFC). Dropout rates are often one of the factors assessed when ranking UK universities in league tables.

In November 2014, a report from the Institute for Fiscal Studies found that students from poorer home backgrounds were 8.4 percentage points more likely to drop out of university in the first two years of an undergraduate course than those from the richest homes; they were also 22.9 percentage points less likely to obtain a 2:1 or first degree. For students studying on the same course and who arrived at university with similar grades, the differences fell but remained significant. The report concluded that more should be done both to raise the attainment levels of poorer students prior to their arrival at university and to provide additional support to them at university.

== United States ==
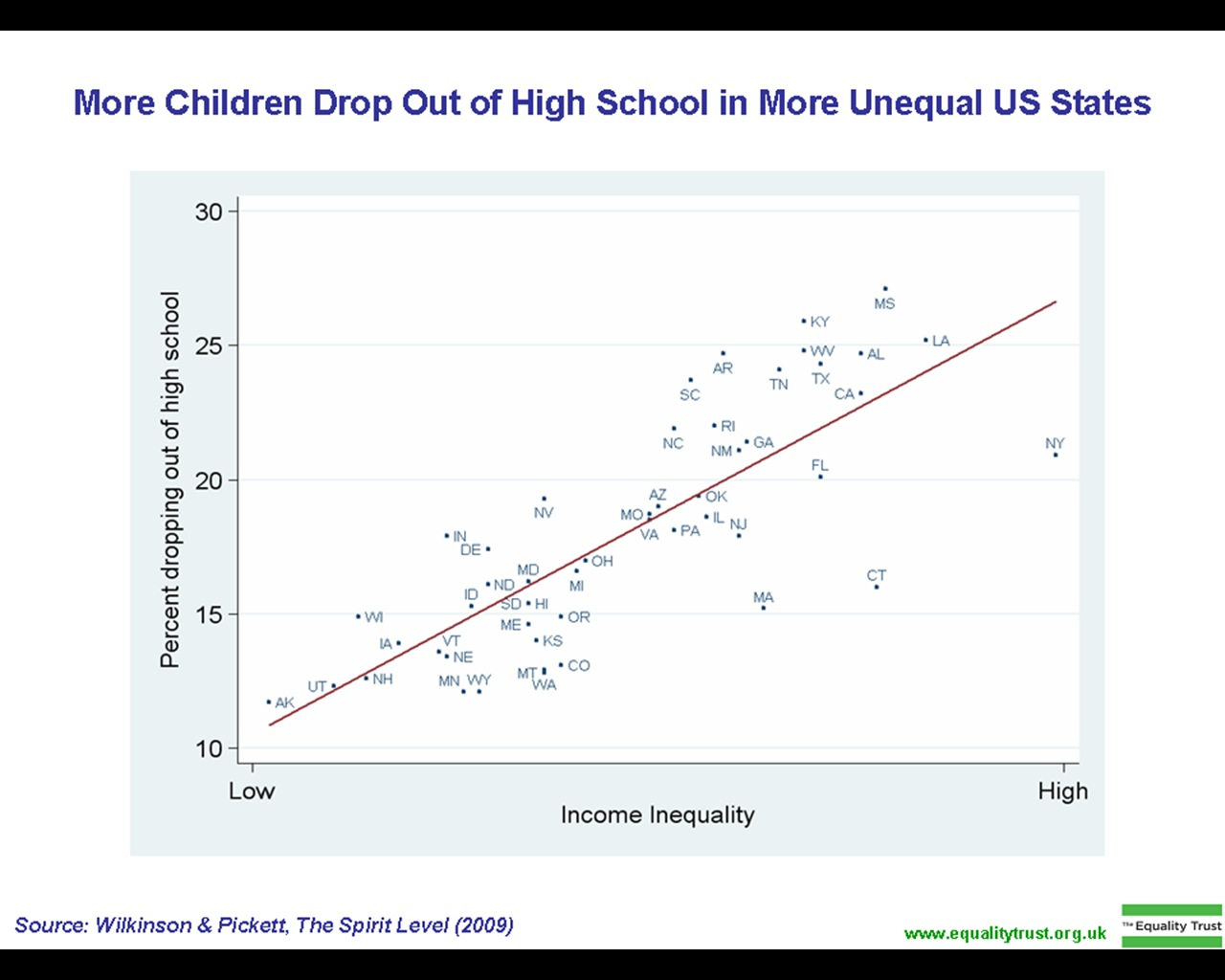
More children drop out of high school in US states with higher economic inequality.

In the United States, dropping out most commonly refers to a student quitting school without fulfilling the requirements for graduation. It cannot always be ascertained that a student has dropped out, as they may stop attending without terminating enrollment. It is estimated 1.2 million students annually drop out of high school in the United States, where high school graduation rates rank 19th in the world. Reasons are varied and may include: to find employment, avoid bullying, family emergency, poor grades, depression and other mental illnesses, unexpected pregnancy, bad environment, lack of freedom, and even boredom. The Silent Epidemic: Perspectives of High School Dropouts by Civic Enterprises explores reasons students leave school without graduating. The consequences of dropping out of school can have long-term economic and social repercussions. Students who drop out of school in the United States are more likely to be unemployed, homeless, receiving welfare and incarcerated. A four-year study in San Francisco found that 94 percent of young murder victims were high school dropouts.

The United States Department of Education's measurement of the status dropout rate is the percentage of 16-24-year-olds who are not enrolled in school and have not earned a high school credential. This rate is different from the event dropout rate and related measures of the status completion and average freshman completion rates. The status high school dropout rate in 2009 was 8.1%. There are many risk factors for high school dropout. These can be categorized into social and academic risk factors. Members of racial and ethnic minority groups drop out at higher rates than white students, as do those from low-income families, from single-parent households, and from families in which one or both parents also did not complete high school. Students at risk for dropout based on academic risk factors are those who often have a history of absenteeism and grade retention, academic trouble, and more general disengagement from school life.

== Australia ==
In Australia, dropping out most commonly refers to a student quitting school before they graduate. Reasons for students dropping out vary, but they usually include the following: avoiding bullies, finding employment, family problems, mental illness, teenage pregnancy, substance abuse and in some cases even boredom. Researchers at Melbourne's Mitchell Institute have found that a quarter of Australian high school students are not graduating year 12, and that completion rates are much worse in remote or economically disadvantaged communities. Professor Teese believes the segregation of students in schools through geography as well as in the private and public systems means student disadvantage is stronger in Australia than other western nations such as New Zealand and Canada. Drop out rates vary throughout different locations in Australia. Students that attend school in remote communities have a higher chance of not completing year 12 (56.6%), whereas students that come from a wealthy background share an average completion rate of 90%. These remote schooling programs serve primarily indigenous students. Indigenous students to have lower rates of completion: the gap between indigenous and non-indigenous year 12 graduates is over 40 percentage points. As a result of this substantial difference, lower socioeconomic students who drop out are considered at-risk-students and are ultimately prone to unemployment, incarceration, low-paying employment and having children at early ages.

== Latin America ==
According to a survey done by UNESCO on Latin American dropout rates, there were two main reasons for dropping out; financial difficulties and disinterest in studying. Furthermore, 20% of students aged 15 to 17 dropped out due to difficulty with work, and an additional 20% drop out due to "parenting duties and associated domestic tasks." 38% of adolescents aged 15 to 17 and 22% of children aged 10 to 11 have stated that studying is the main reason they dropped out.

== Dropout recovery ==
A "dropout recovery" initiative is any community, government, non-profit or business program in which students who have previously left school are sought out for the purpose of re-enrollment. In the U.S., such initiatives are often focused on former high school students who are still young enough to have their educations publicly subsidized, generally those 22 years of age and younger. In Rwanda, dropout recovery is often focused on primary- and ordinary-level students who are still young and able to continue their education.

Dropout recovery programs can be initiated in traditional "brick-and-mortar" institutions of learning, in community centers or online.

Dropping out of high school can have drastic long-term economic and social repercussions, especially in Australia which has a less equitable education system than many other western countries. Therefore, different pathways and courses of study are being implemented by the government, non-profit organizations, and private companies to offer a selection of education recovery plans for young adults around the age of 22 and below.

== Attrition ==
Students that drop out of high-school are generally those that struggle to engage behaviorally and/or academically. However, it is not entirely clear whether different types of contextual or self-system variables affect students' engagement or contribute to their decision to drop out. According to data collected by the national education longitudinal study of 1988, Rumberger found that students with moderate to high absenteeism, behavior problems and having no school or outside activities were highly predictive of dropping out.

== Prevention ==
=== Family dynamics ===
Impact of parent's education level on student's success rate, 5 years after university enrollment, Portugal, 2021.

Under the pact of educational inclusion at the secondary level, how families organize themselves internally to produce well-being is an unavoidable topic for countries to address when seeking to broaden the effective opportunities of access to, retention in and graduation from secondary education. Therefore, the construction of a new policy, the adolescent and the young person at school, is an acknowledgement of what is happening in reality and shapes a mutually beneficial alliance between the state and families to generate dynamics where young people can become exclusive recipients of care – at least until completion of their secondary schooling.

== See also ==
- All but dissertation
- Alternative Learning System of basic education for either grade school or high school dropouts in the Philippines
- At-risk students
- Attrition (research)
- Churn rate
- Disengagement from education
- Expulsion (education)
- Rustication (academia)
- School-leaving age
- Suspension (punishment)
- TAFE
- List of Harvard University non-graduate alumni

== Sources ==
This article incorporates text from a free content work. Licensed under CC-BY-SA IGO 3.0 (license statement/permission). Text taken from Youth and changing realities: rethinking secondary education in Latin America, 22-24, 28, López, Néstor; Opertti, Renato; Vargas Tamez, Carlos, UNESCO. UNESCO.
