= Intention-to-treat analysis =

Form of analysis for clinical trials

In medicine, an intention-to-treat (ITT) analysis of the results of a randomized controlled trial is based on the initial treatment assignment and not on the treatment eventually received. ITT analysis is intended to avoid various misleading artifacts that can arise in intervention research such as non-random attrition of participants from the study or crossover. ITT is also simpler than other forms of study design and analysis, because it does not require observation of compliance status for units assigned to different treatments or incorporation of compliance into the analysis. Although ITT analysis is widely employed in published clinical trials, it can be incorrectly described and there are some issues with its application. Furthermore, there is no consensus on how to carry out an ITT analysis in the presence of missing outcome data.

== Rationale ==
Randomized clinical trials analyzed by the intention-to-treat (ITT) approach provide unbiased comparisons among the treatment groups. Intention to treat analyses are done to avoid the effects of crossover and dropout, which may break the random assignment to the treatment groups in a study. ITT analysis provides information about the potential effects of treatment policy rather than on the potential effects of specific treatment.

Since it started in the 1960s, the principle of ITT has become widely accepted for the analysis of controlled clinical trials.

=== Example ===
In an ITT population, none of the patients are excluded and the patients are analyzed according to the randomization scheme. In other words, for the purposes of ITT analysis, everyone who is randomized in the trial is considered to be part of the trial regardless of whether he or she is dosed or completes the trial.

For example, if people who have a more refractory or serious problem tend to drop out of a study at a higher rate, even a completely ineffective treatment may appear to be providing benefits if one merely compares the condition before and after the treatment for only those who finish the study (ignoring those who were enrolled originally, but have since been excluded or dropped out).

== Issues ==
Medical investigators often have difficulties in completing ITT analysis because of clinical trial issues like missing data or poor treatment protocol adherence.

To address some of these issues, many clinical trials have excluded participants after the random assignment in their analysis, which is often referred to as modified intention-to-treat analysis or mITT. Trials employing mITT have been linked to industry sponsorship and conflicts of interest by the authors.

=== Missing data ===
An important problem is the occurrence of missing data for participants in a clinical trial. This can happen when patients are lost to follow-up (for instance, by withdrawal due to adverse effects of the intervention) and no response is obtainable for these patients. However, full application of ITT analysis can only be performed where there is complete outcome data for all randomized subjects.

In order to include such participants in an analysis, outcome data could be imputed which involves making assumptions about the outcomes in the lost participants. Another approach would be efficacy subset analysis which selects the subset of the patients who received the treatment of interest—regardless of initial randomization—and who have not dropped out for any reason. This approach can introduce biases to the statistical analysis. It can also inflate the chance of a false positive; this effect is greater the larger the trial.

=== Adherence to protocol ===
ITT analysis requires participants to be included even if they did not fully adhere to the protocol. Participants who strayed from the protocol (for instance, by not adhering to the prescribed intervention, or by being withdrawn from active treatment) should still be kept in the analysis. An extreme variation of this is the participants who receive the treatment from the group they were not allocated to, who should be kept in their original group for the analysis. This issue causes no problems provided that the systematic reviewer can extract the appropriate data from the trial reports. The rationale for this approach is that, in the first instance, the goal is to estimate the effects of allocating an intervention in practice, not the effects in the subgroup of the participants who adhere to it.

In comparison, in a per-protocol analysis, only patients who complete the entire clinical trial according to the protocol are counted towards the final results.

== See also ==
- Analysis of clinical trials
- Protocol (natural sciences)
- Clinical trial
- Randomized controlled trial
