= At-risk students =

Student who requires temporary or ongoing intervention

An at-risk student is a term used in the United States to describe a student who requires temporary or ongoing intervention in order to succeed academically. At-risk students, sometimes referred to as at-risk youth or at-promise youth, are also adolescents who are less likely to transition successfully into adulthood and achieve economic self-sufficiency. Characteristics of at-risk students include emotional or behavioral problems, truancy, low academic performance, showing a lack of interest for academics, and expressing a disconnection from the school environment. A school's effort to at-risk students is essential. For example, a study showed that 80% to 87% of variables that led to a school's retention are predictable with linear modeling. In January 2020, Governor Gavin Newsom of California changed all references to "at-risk" to "at-promise" in the California Penal Codes.

== History of the Term "At Risk" ==
The term "at-risk" came into use after the 1983 article "A Nation at Risk," published by the National Commission on Excellence in Education. The article described United States society as being economically and socially endangered. At-risk students are those students who have been labeled, either officially or unofficially, as being in danger of academic failure. In the U.S., different states define "at-risk" differently, so it is difficult to compare the varying state policies on the subject.

Students who are labeled as "at-risk" face a number of challenges that other students do not. According to Becky Smerdon's research for the American Institutes for Research, students, especially boys, with low socioeconomic status (and therefore more likely to be labeled "at-risk") show feelings of isolation and estrangement in their schools. Educational philosopher Gloria Ladson-Billings claimed in a 2006 speech that the label itself actually contributes to the challenges. Ladson-Billings stated, "We cannot saddle these babies at kindergarten with this label and expect them to proudly wear it for the next 13 years, and think, 'Well, gee, I don't know why they aren't doing good.'" There is an ongoing conversation among experts in this field about the importance of asset-based terminology. In 2021, the National Youth-At-Risk Journal changed their name to the National Youth Advocacy and Resilience Journal to reflect a strengths-based perspective.

== History of Prevention for "At-Risk Youth" ==
At the time of the mid-20th century, the term, "at-risk" wasn't identified or acknowledged in society. However, during the 1960s and 1970s, there was a pivotal point in how society viewed juvenile offenders and their approach to restorative justice. Studies have shown that punitive measures were often ineffective in addressing the reduction in juvenile crimes. Through research and findings, it resulted in factors that effect a youth's action and increase risk in encountering the juvenile system. It later identified that at-risk youth have a higher chance entering the juvenile system. Subsequently, the need for preventative juvenile justice services, specifically from community services, to help youth, take preventive action, and navigate youth entering and exiting the juvenile system. Preventative juvenile justice services became needed at the end of the 1970s and there is still current debates on preventing juveniles from entering the juvenile system.

== Contributing factors documented in the United States ==
=== Poverty ===
Youth that come from low socio-economic status are more likely to be labeled "at-risk." Impoverished environments can create several risk factors for youth, making them increasingly vulnerable to risk-behaviors and impacted life outcomes as they grow. Growing up in poverty is associated with several risk factors, including those social-behavioral (for example substance abuse), environmental (violent neighborhoods), ecological, and familial (exposure to psychological imbalance). These risk factors are shown to have negative correlations with academic achievement, and positive correlations with problem behaviors. Youth living in households with income under 50% of the federal poverty level are those most vulnerable.

=== Family instability and dysfunction ===
Growing up in a stable two-parent household is associated with better health, academic achievement, and social skills like healthy interaction with peers. Studies have shown changes in structure, such as parental divorce, co-habitation, and remarriage, have strong negative relationships between multiple transitions and academic success. Children who are exposed to domestic violence, criminal activity, or substance abuse have a much higher chance of long-term behavioral problems, such as alcoholism and drug abuse and mental health problems.

=== School environment and community resources ===
Schools can place students "at-risk" by leaving them without academic skills and preparedness. School environments can often be places of struggle for many adolescent youth. Bullying in particular is likely to lead to student disengagement putting students at risk for behavioral problems and school dropout.

High poverty neighborhoods are often characterized by high crime rates, limited resources, and underperforming schools. Schools with fewer resources are more likely to be associated with poor academic outcomes. Fewer resources means higher student to teacher ratios, lower spending per student, and lower overall academic performance. These neighborhoods often lack the resources needed to help youth overcome risk factors.

=== Minority youth ===
Minority youth, particularly African-Americans and Latino youth, face many barriers to self-sufficiency that white and Asian students are less likely to face. Racial discrimination often leads to violence, bullying, and also hinders youth employment opportunity. African-Americans and Latinos are more likely to live in high poverty environments characterized by underperforming schools with limited resources and therefore have a higher chance of academic failure. Immigrant youth also face several challenges with adapting to the culture and experience intensified problems such as language barriers and legal battles.

=== Affluent youth ===
In addition to children "traditionally considered to be at risk", "preteens and teens from affluent, well-educated families" are also at risk. Despite their advantages in other areas, affluent youth have among "the highest rates of depression, substance abuse, anxiety disorders, somatic complaints, and unhappiness" Madeline Levine writes that this "should in no way minimize concern" for other at risk groups.

== Early intervention ==
There are several different forms of interventions for at-risk youth. Interventions are generally considered effective if they have positive impacts on individuals' risk behavior, academic achievement, pro-social behavior, sexual behavior, and psychological adjustment. Effective interventions can also serve as a preventative measure for future risk behavior, and it can help at risk-youth avoid entering the juvenile systems. There is a significant correlation between high-risk youth and higher rates of juvenile system involvement. Through research and findings, factors such as low socio-economic status, race/ethnicity, gender, and psychosocial histories of mental health and substance abuse have resulted in an increased risk that a youth will encounter the juvenile system. People have discovered the need for juvenile justice services, specifically community services to take preventive action and to support youth as they navigate entering and exiting the juvenile system.

=== Remediation ===
The sooner at-risk students are identified, the more likely that preventative "remediation" measures will be effective. Examples of remediation include:

- remediation programs
- tutoring
- child care services
- medical care
- substance abuse awareness programs
- bilingual instruction
- employment training
- close follow up procedures on truancy and absenteeism.
- mentorship
- academic advising
- career and technical education

=== Resilience ===
Psychologists have recognized that many youth adjust properly despite being raised in high risk circumstances. This capacity to cope with adversity, even being strengthened by it, is crucial to developing resilience; or the human capacity to face, overcome, and ultimately be strengthened by life's adversities and challenges.

Psychological resilience is an important character trait for youth trying to mitigate risk factors. Resilience is used to describe the qualities that aid in the successful adaptation, life-transition, and social competence of youth despite risk and adversity. Resilience is manifested by having a strong sense of purpose and a belief in success; including goal direction, education aspirations, motivation, persistence, and optimism. Getting youth involved in extracurricular activities is important in building resilience and remediation. Particularly, those involving cooperative approaches such as peer helping, cross age mentoring, and community service. Data examined from a nationally funded study has shown that teachers can promote academic resilience in students at risk for failure in mathematics through creating safe school environments which emphasize support and the development of strong teacher-student relationships. These factors were associated with the academic resilience and achievement of low-income Latino, White, and African-American elementary school students. Teachers can further contribute to a strong classroom environment for students who face risk factors by holding all students accountable to expectations that are both high and realistic for the given student.

Childhood trauma is detrimental and can be damaging during emotional development. Overcoming trauma contributes significantly to resilience. Many youth that have experienced trauma have an inability to cope with and adjust to new surroundings. Trauma overwhelms one's ability to cope and may lead them to isolate against the fears of modern life, often viewing the world as a threatening or dangerous place. These students distrust others, including adults, and because of traumatic experiences rely on themselves to keep safe. New or unexpected stimuli can often trigger traumatic flash-backs. Slamming doors, loud announcements, students and teachers shouting can trigger instant terror within a child who has suffered from trauma. Teachers are critical in nurturing and building resilience in at-risk students exposed to trauma. Although, being empowered to participate in their own healing, gives young people a sense of self-control, safety, and purpose.

== At-risk students globally ==
=== North America ===
==== Canada ====
Juvenile delinquency and school dropout are a significant problem in Canada. In 2010 37% of youth self-reported engaging in one or more delinquent behaviors such as acts of violence, acts against property, and the sale of drugs. Canadian boys are twice as likely as girls to engage in violent behavior but about equal in crimes against property. In 2010 the rate of those accused of a crime peaked at 18 years of age and generally decreased with age. School dropout rates between 2009 and 2010 were around 10% of young males and 7% of young women. Only 44% of children in foster care graduate from high school compared to 81% of their peers.

==== Mexico ====
A large percentage of youth in Mexico are considered at-risk and many engage in negative behaviors. 30% of Mexican youth ages 12–24 drop out of school and remain unemployed and inactive after age 18. Another 30% of Mexican youths have never participated in any extra-curricular activities outside of a school setting. Many risk factors for Mexican youth are the same as those identified in the United States, however; poverty is a more prevalent influencing factor.

Launched by the United States Agency for International Development (USAID) and the International Youth Foundation (YIF) the Youth:Work Mexico program focuses on putting youth to work and creating a safe space for disadvantaged youth. By the end of 2014 7,500 Mexican youth will have participated in youth camps and after school programs. Nearly 2,000 at-risk youth will have been prepared by job training programs.

==== At-risk programs in the United States ====
===== Title I =====
Title I is one of the largest United States federal programs in K-12 education. Title I provides financial resources to schools, particularly those in low socio-economic communities, to ensure that low-income students meet challenging state academic standards.

===== Big Brothers Big Sisters of America =====
Big Brothers Big Sisters of America is a program that establishes meaningful monitored mentoring between volunteers and at risk youth ages 6–18. Big Brothers Big Sisters is the largest donor and volunteer supported mentoring network in the United States. The organizations mission is to provide children facing adversity with strong, enduring, and professional one-to-one connections that forever change their lives for the better.

===== Reading Rockets =====
Reading Rockets is a United States government funded project that supports the needs of at-risk youth by offering research based reading strategies, lessons, and activities designed to help children learn to read and read better. The program aims to help struggling readers build fluency, vocabulary, and comprehension skills.

===== YMCA =====
YMCA, sometimes regionally known as The Y, is an organization in the US that promotes youth development, healthy living, and social responsibility. Over the years, YMCA has provided various programming, some directed towards at-risk youth. YMCA has engaged with social issues such as racial solidarity, job training, and classes for people with disabilities.

===== SC Youth ChalleNGe Academy =====
SC Youth ChalleNGe Academy is a government funded program that supports at-risk youth ages 16 to 18 in obtaining a GED, high school diploma, or allows them to obtain recovery credits . The program assists them with developing life skills related to health and hygiene, as well as leadership .

== See also ==
- Disengagement from education
- Minorities at Risk

== Bibliography ==
- Sagor, Richard; Cox, Jonas (2004). At-risk Students: Reaching and Teaching Them. Eye On Education. ISBN 978-1-930556-71-3.
- K. Miller, D. Snow, & P. Lauer(2004) Out-of-School Time Programs for At-Risk Students. Retrieved July 9, 2009, from
- Democratic Staff, Committee on Education and Labor, U.S. House of Representatives (2007) FY "2008 Bush Budget:Drastic Education Program Cuts, Funding Reductions and Broken Promises".
