= Tukey's B method =

Statistical post-hoc test for multiple comparisons

Tukey's B method, also known as the Tukey-Kramer B procedure, or Tukey's Wholly Significant Difference (WSD) is a post-hoc multiple comparison statistical test used to identify which specific group means differ significantly from each other after a statistically significant result has been obtained from an analysis of variance (ANOVA). It is considered a compromise between two other popular multiple comparison procedures: Tukey's range test and the Newman-Keuls method.

The primary purpose of post-hoc tests like Tukey's B is to control the family-wise error rate (FWER) when performing multiple comparisons. Without such control, the probability of making at least one Type I error increases with the number of comparisons made.

== History and context ==
The development of multiple comparison procedures stems from the work of Ronald Fisher, John Tukey and others in the mid-20th century. Tukey's HSD test is a conservative method that guarantees the FWER does not exceed the chosen significance level (e.g., $\alpha=0.05$). Conversely, the Newman-Keuls (NK) method, while providing higher statistical power, is known to be anti-conservative; that is, not strictly controlling the FWER as the number of groups increases.

Tukey's B method was introduced to provide an intermediate level of conservatism. It seeks to balance the strict error control of HSD with the greater sensitivity to differences offered by Newman-Keuls.

== Methodology ==
Tukey's B method operates by comparing all possible pairs of means. For each pair, it calculates a critical value based on the studentized range distribution.

While Tukey's HSD uses a single critical value $q_\text{HSD}$ derived from the total number of groups ($k$), and Newman-Keuls uses critical values $q_\text{NK}$ that vary depending on the number of steps between the ordered means ($r$), Tukey's B calculates the critical value ($q_B$) as the simple arithmetic mean of the critical values obtained from those two procedures:

$$q_\text{B} = \frac{q_\text{HSD} + q_\text{NK}}{2}$$

The absolute difference between two means, $\vert \bar{X}_i - \bar{X}_j\vert$, is then compared against a critical difference value:

$$\text{CD}_\text{B}=q_\text{B}\sqrt{\frac{\text{MS}_\text{error}}{2}\left(\frac{1}{n_i} + \frac{1}{n_j}\right)}$$

where:

- $\text{MS}_\text{error}$ is the mean squared error from the ANOVA, and
- $n_i$ and $n_j$ are the sample sizes of the groups being compared.

If $\vert\bar{X}_i - \bar{X}_j\vert > \text{CD}_\text{B}$, the difference is declared statistically significant.

== Characteristics and comparison with other methods ==
Tukey's B method is a standard post-hoc option in statistical packages such as SPSS, and provides a middle ground for researchers:

- Error rate control: it offers better control over the family-wise-error rate than the Newman-Keuls method, but is less conservative than Tukey's HSD.
- Statistical power: it generally has greater statistical power than Tukey's HSD, making it more likely to detect true differences.

== Statistical criticism ==
In contemporary statistical practice, the procedure has largely fallen out of favor due to several factors:

- Theoretical grounding: unlike the Tukey HSD, which is rooted in the distribution of the studentized range, Tukey's B lacks a rigorous mathematical justification for its averaging approach.
- Error rate control: because it is a hybrid, it does not guarantee the same level of family-wise error rate protection as more modern, stepwise procedures.
- Availability of alternatives: the development of more powerful and theoretically sound procedures, such as the Ryan-Einot-Gabriel-Welsch (REGW) or the Fisher-Hayter test, has rendered Tukey's B largely obsolete in most modern statistical software packages.

== See also ==
- Post-hoc analysis
- Multiple comparisons problem
- Tukey's range test
- Newman–Keuls method
