= Fisher's least significant difference =

Post-hoc statistical test for pairwise comparisons

- Type: Post-hoc analysis
- Developer: Ronald Fisher
- Year: 1935
- Purpose: Pairwise comparison of group means
- Requirement: Significant ANOVA F-test

In statistics, Fisher's least significant difference (LSD) is a procedure used to identify statistically significant differences between the means of multiple groups. Developed by Ronald Fisher in 1935, it was the first post-hoc test designed to be performed following a significant analysis of variance (ANOVA) result.

The method is intended to control the Type I error rate while maintaining higher statistical power than more conservative adjustments, such as the Bonferroni correction. It remains widely used in fields like agronomy and the social sciences.

== Methodology ==
The LSD procedure is typically applied in two stages, a process often referred to as Fisher's protected LSD:

1. Omnibus test: an F-test is performed via ANOVA to determine if there are any statistically significant differences among the group means. If the F-test is not significant, the procedure stops to prevent inflating the family-wise error rate.
2. Pairwise comparisons: if the omnibus F-test from step 1 is significant, pairwise t-tests are conducted for all pairs of groups. These tests use a pooled variance estimated derived from the ANOVA in step 1.

=== Mathematical formulation ===
The least significant difference for two groups $i$ and $j$ is calculated as:

$$\text{LSD}_{i,j}=t_{\alpha/2,\text{df}_E} \sqrt{\text{MS}_E\left(\frac{1}{n_i} + \frac{1}{n_j}\right)}$$

where:

- $t_{\alpha/2,\text{df}_E}$ is the critical value from the t-distribution for a given significance level $\alpha$ and the error degrees of freedom $\text{df}_E$ from the ANOVA.
- $\text{MS}_E$ is the mean square error from the ANOVA.
- $n_i$ and $n_j$ are the sample sizes of the groups being compared.

== Comparison with other methods ==
Fisher's LSD is categorized as an "anti-conservative" test because it does not directly adjust the Type I error rate for the total number of comparisons.

=== Versus Bonferroni ===
Unlike the Bonferroni correction, which divides the significance level by the number of comparisons $m$, Fisher's LSD maintains the per-comparison error rate at $\alpha$. While this increases the probability of finding a true effect (power), it also increases the risk of a false positive when the number of groups is large.

=== Versus Tukey's HSD ===
Tukey's Honest Significant Difference (HSD) controls the family-wise error rate for all possible pairwise comparisons. Fisher's LSD is generally more powerful than Tukey's HSD but is only considered valid for controlling the family-wise error rate when comparing exactly three groups.

== Criticisms and limitations ==
The primary criticism of Fisher's LSD is that the "protection" offered by the omnibus F-test diminishes as the number of groups increases. For four or more groups, the probability of at least one Type I error occurring among the pairwise comparisons can exceed the nominal $\alpha$, even if the F-test is significant. For this reason, for experiments involving many groups, many statisticians recommend more modern procedures like the Holm–Bonferroni method or Tukey's range test.

== See also ==
- Multiple comparisons problem
- Newman–Keuls method
- Post-hoc analysis
- Tukey's range test
