= Tukey's test =

There are several major statistical tests or procedures that bear the name Tukey's test:

- Siegel–Tukey test, a non-parametric test used to determine if two samples have significantly different scales (variances)
- Tukey's B method, also called Tukey-Kramer B procedure, or Tukey's WSD (Wholly Significant Difference)
- Tukey–Duckworth test, a simple non-parametric test used to test whether two samples come from the same population
- Tukey's range test, also called Tukey method, Tukey's honest significance test, Tukey's HSD (Honestly Significant Difference) test
- Tukey's test of additivity, an approach used in two-way ANOVA to assess whether the factors are additively related to the expected value of the response
- Tukey's trend test, used to detect a monotonic trend across groups (e.g., as dosage increases, does the response consistently increase?)
