= Student (disambiguation) =

A student is a learner, or someone who attends a school or takes classes.

Student may also refer to:

== Arts and entertainment ==
- Student (film), a 2012 Kazakhstan film by Darezhan Omirbayev
- Students, a 1953 novel by Yury Trifonov
- Student, a magazine published in 1968 by Richard Branson
- Student, the Malayalam-language newspaper of the Students' Federation of India

== Education ==
- Student (degree), an educational qualification in some countries
- Student, a senior member of the college at Christ Church, Oxford

== People ==
- Kurt Student (1890–1978), German general
- William Sealy Gosset (1876–1937), pen name Student, statistician

== Other uses ==
- STUDENT (computer program), an early artificial intelligence program
- Melbourne University Football Club, nicknamed the Students

== See also ==
- Studentization, the process of adjusting a statistic for an estimate of its standard deviation
- Studentized range
- Studentized residual
- Student's t-test, a statistical technique
- Student's t-distribution, a probability distribution
- The Student (disambiguation)
