= The Student =

The Student may refer to:

== Movies ==
- The Student (2011 film), an Argentine film
- The Student (2016 film), a Russian film
- The Student, a 1961 Egyptian film directed by Hassan al-Imam
- The Student, a 2017 film starring Blake Michael

== Literature ==
- "The Student" (short story), a work by Anton Chekhov
- The Student (novel), see Cary Fagan

== Other ==
- The Student (Yaroshenko), a painting by Nikolai Yaroshenko
- The Student (newspaper), a newspaper by students at the University of Edinburgh

== See also ==
- The Student's, former name of the Japanese musical duo marble
- Student (disambiguation)
