= Closed testing procedure =

In statistics, the closed testing procedure is a general method for performing more than one hypothesis test simultaneously.

== The closed testing principle ==
Suppose there are k hypotheses H_{1},..., H_{k} to be tested and the overall type I error rate is α. The closed testing principle allows the rejection of any one of these elementary hypotheses, say H_{i}, if all possible intersection hypotheses involving H_{i} can be rejected by using valid local level α tests; the adjusted p-value is the largest among those hypotheses. It controls the family-wise error rate for all the k hypotheses at level α in the strong sense.

== Example ==
Suppose there are three hypotheses H_{1},H_{2}, and H_{3} to be tested and the overall type I error rate is 0.05. Then H_{1} can be rejected at level α if H_{1} ∩ H_{2} ∩ H_{3}, H_{1} ∩ H_{2}, H_{1} ∩ H_{3} and H_{1} can all be rejected using valid tests with α = 0.05.

== Special cases ==
The Holm–Bonferroni method is a special case of a closed test procedure for which each intersection null hypothesis is tested using the simple Bonferroni test. As such, it controls the family-wise error rate for all the k hypotheses at level α in the strong sense.

Multiple test procedures developed using the graphical approach for constructing and illustrating multiple test procedures are a subclass of closed testing procedures.

== See also ==
- Multiple comparisons
- Holm–Bonferroni method
- Bonferroni correction
