= Studentized range =

In statistics, the studentized range, denoted q, is the difference between the largest and smallest data in a sample normalized by the sample standard deviation. It is named after William Sealy Gosset (who wrote under the pseudonym "Student"), and was introduced by him in 1927. The concept was later discussed by Newman (1939), Keuls (1952), and John Tukey in some unpublished notes. Its statistical distribution is the studentized range distribution, which is used for multiple comparison procedures, such as the single step procedure Tukey's range test, the Newman–Keuls method, and the Duncan's step down procedure, and establishing confidence intervals that are still valid after data snooping has occurred.

== Description ==
The value of the studentized range, most often represented by the variable q, can be defined based on a random sample x_{1}, ..., x_{n} from the N(0, 1) distribution of numbers, and another random variable s that is independent of all the x_{i}, and νs^{2} has a χ^{2} distribution with ν degrees of freedom. Then

$$q _{n,\nu}= \frac{\max\{\,x_1,\ \dots, \ x_n\,\} - \min\{\,x_1,\ \dots,\ x_n\}}{s} = \max_{i,j=1, \dots, n} \left\{\frac{x_i - x_j}{s}\right\}$$

has the Studentized range distribution for n groups and ν degrees of freedom. In applications, the x_{i} are typically the means of samples each of size m, s^{2} is the pooled variance, and the degrees of freedom are ν = n(m − 1).

The critical value of q is based on three factors:

1. α (the probability of rejecting a true null hypothesis)
2. n (the number of observations or groups)
3. ν (the degrees of freedom used to estimate the sample variance)

== Distribution ==
If X_{1}, ..., X_{n} are independent identically distributed random variables that are normally distributed, the probability distribution of their studentized range is what is usually called the studentized range distribution. Note that the definition of q does not depend on the expected value or the standard deviation of the distribution from which the sample is drawn, and therefore its probability distribution is the same regardless of those parameters.

== Studentization ==
Generally, the term studentized means that the variable's scale was adjusted by dividing by an estimate of a population standard deviation (see also studentized residual). The fact that the standard deviation is a sample standard deviation rather than the population standard deviation, and thus something that differs from one random sample to the next, is essential to the definition and the distribution of the Studentized data. The variability in the value of the sample standard deviation contributes additional uncertainty into the values calculated. This complicates the problem of finding the probability distribution of any statistic that is studentized.

== See also ==
- Studentized range distribution
- Tukey's range test
