= Prevention paradox =

Situation in epidemiology

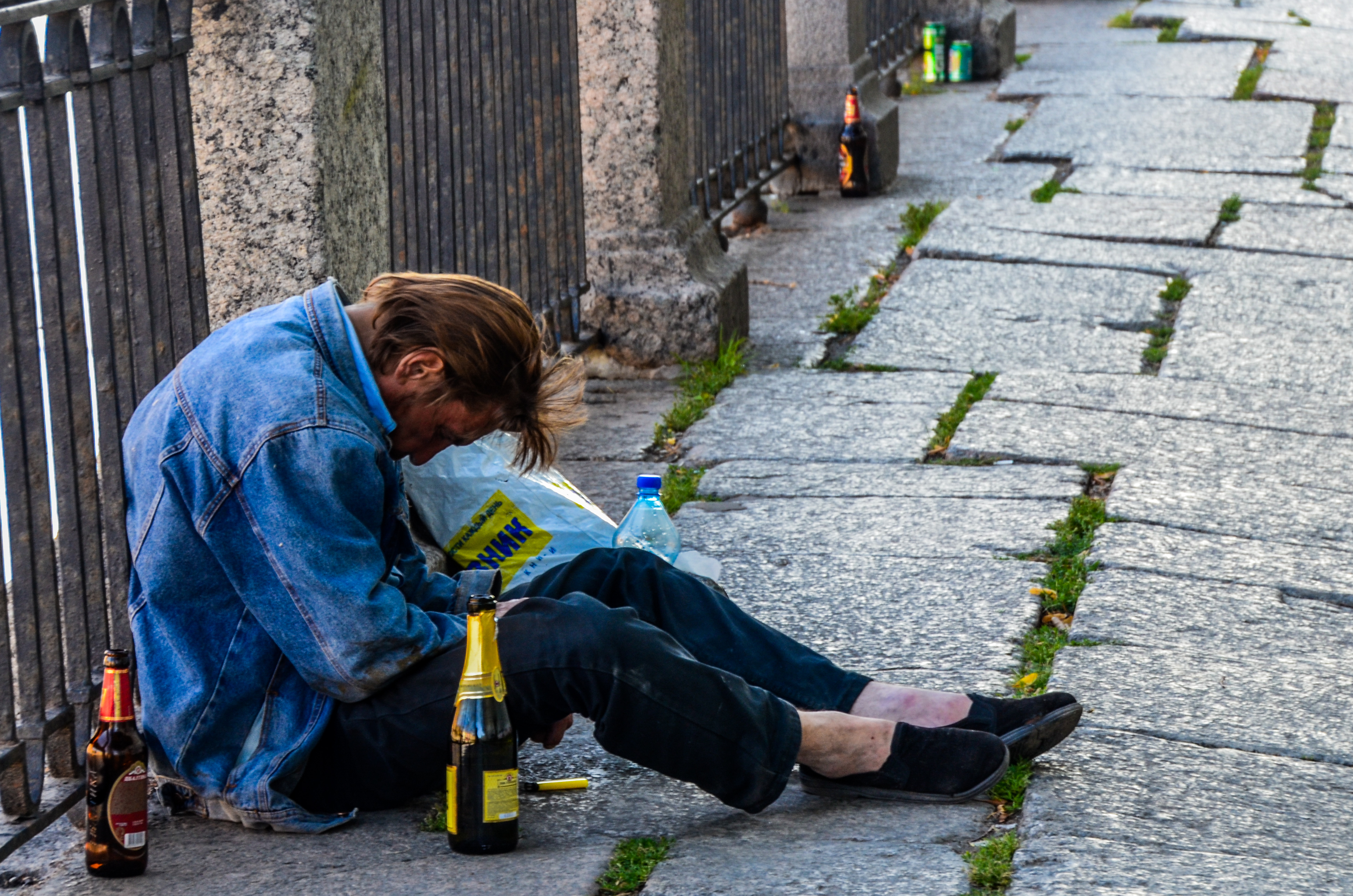
The prevention paradox can be seen in various diseases, including alcohol dependence.

The prevention paradox describes the situation where the majority of cases of a disease come from a population at low or moderate risk of that disease, and only a minority of cases come from the high risk population (of the same disease). This is because the number of people at high risk is small. The prevention paradox was first formally described in 1981 by the epidemiologist Geoffrey Rose.

Especially in the context of the COVID-19 pandemic, the term "prevention paradox" was also used to describe the apparent paradox of people questioning steps to prevent the spread of the pandemic because the prophesied spread did not occur. This however is instead an example of a self-defeating prophecy or a preparedness paradox.

== Hypothetical case study ==
For example, Rose describes the case of Down syndrome where maternal age is a risk factor. Yet, most cases of Down syndrome will be born to younger, low risk mothers (this is true at least in populations where most women have children at a younger age). This situation is paradoxical because it is common and logical to equate high-risk populations with making up the majority of the burden of disease.

Another example could be seen in terms of reducing overall alcohol misuse problems in a population. Although less serious, most alcohol problems are not found among dependent drinkers. Greater societal gain will be obtained by achieving a small reduction in alcohol misuse within a far larger group of "risky" drinkers with less serious problems than by trying to reduce problems among a smaller number of alcoholic drinkers with serious addiction issues.

== See also ==
- False positive paradox
- Preparedness paradox
