= Natural frequency (statistics) =

Notation for displaying probabilities

Visualising natural frequencies in a natural frequency tree improves understanding. The numbers in the boxes are the natural frequencies, while the numbers next to the branches are the conditional probabilities.

A common question in medicine is how likely it is that someone has a disease when they get a 'positive' test result. Because some people without the disease also test positive, not everyone who tests positive has the disease. Expressing the probabilities using natural frequencies – absolute counts from a sample showing the joint probabilities (disease x test result) – makes the question easier to answer. For example, by stating that 100 out of 10,000 women have breast cancer, 90 out of 100 with breast cancer have a positive mammogram and 990 out of 9,900 without breast cancer have a positive mammogram.

In contrast, people struggle when you give the same information as conditional probabilities. That is, when they are given information in a format like this: 80% of women with breast cancer test positive on a mammogram, whereas 9.6% of healthy women also get a positive test (false positive). One percent of women has breast cancer. People often neglect the base rate of people with breast cancer when given this information (base rate fallacy), leading them to overestimate how likely it is someone has the disease given a positive test result.

In one study, only 6% of medical students could resolve the above question when given probabilities. When the information was presented in natural frequencies instead, 42% gave the correct answer. The students were also twice as fast when using natural frequencies, compared to receiving the information as conditional probabilities. Students who received a visualisation of either were more accurate than students who got textual information. Similarly, another study found that gynaecologists strongly overestimated the chance someone has breast cancer after a positive mammogram.

Similarly, when judging DNA evidence in legal contexts, natural frequencies help improve decisions. DNA evidence is not 100% certain, mostly because there is a small chance of a lab error. When provided with natural frequencies, hypothetical jurors made fewer mistakes interpreting DNA evidence, leading to fewer guilty verdicts.

== See also ==
- Bayesian reasoning
