= Self-defeating =

Self-defeating may refer to:

- Self-defeating personality disorder
- Self-defeating prophecy
- Self-refuting idea
