= The Devil Never Sleeps =

The Devil Never Sleeps may refer to:

- The Devil Never Sleeps (Kayyem book), a nonfiction book about anticipating disasters by Juliette Kayyem
- The Devil Never Sleeps: and Other Essays, a collection of short stories by Andrei Codrescu
- The Devil Never Sleeps (film) a 1994 Mexican-American documentary film
- Satan Never Sleeps, also known as The Devil Never Sleeps, a 1962 American drama romance war film
