= Juliette Kayyem =

American politician, author, and analyst

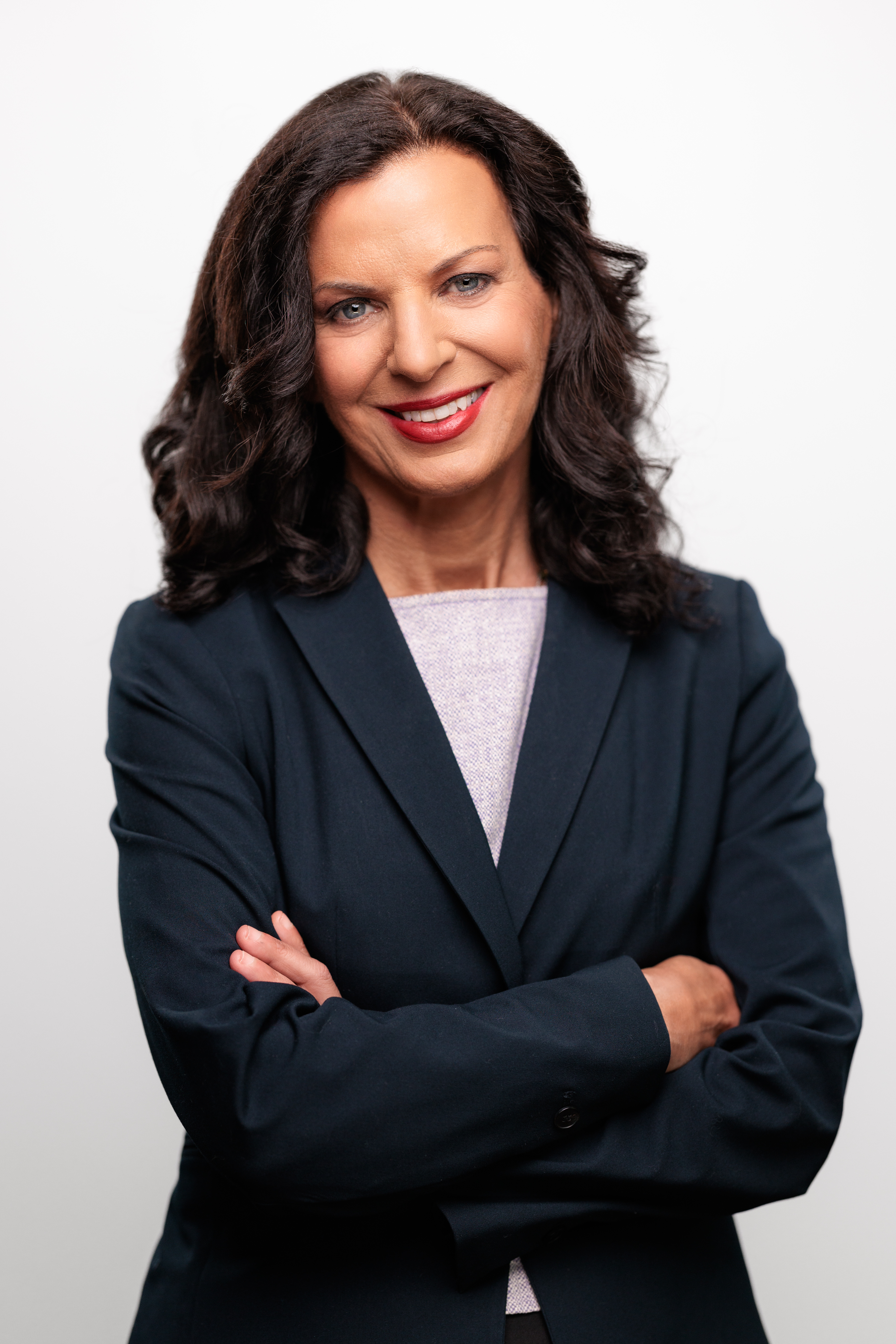
- Kayyem in 2025

U.S. Assistant Secretary of Homeland Security for Intergovernmental Affairs
- In office 2009–2010
- President: Barack Obama
- Deputy: Stephanie Tennyson
- Preceded by: Anne Petera
- Succeeded by: Betsy Markey

Personal details
- Born: August 16, 1969 (age 57) Los Angeles, California, U.S.
- Party: Democratic
- Spouse: David J. Barron
- Children: 3
- Education: Harvard University (BA, JD)

Juliette N. Kayyem (born August 16, 1969) is an American former government official and author. She is the Robert and Renée Belfer Senior Lecturer in International Security at the Harvard Kennedy School, where she also serves as Faculty Chair of the Homeland Security Project. She is host of the Boston-based radio channel WGBH (FM)'s podcast The SCIF, and has also appeared on CNN and Boston Public Radio, and written columns for The Boston Globe. She is also a Senior National Security Analyst for CNN and a contributing writer for The Atlantic magazine, where she writes on terrorism, disaster preparedness, and national security policy.

Kayyem was formerly Massachusetts' first Undersecretary for Homeland Security, and served as Assistant Secretary for Intergovernmental Affairs in the United States Department of Homeland Security under the Obama administration. She is also a former candidate for Governor of Massachusetts, and has also held positions as a Belfer Lecturer in International Security at the John F. Kennedy School of Government and as a member of the Council on Foreign Relations and the Pacific Council on International Policy.

Kayyem also previously served a senior advisor to the NSO Group, the Israeli tech firm known for the Pegasus spyware tool. In October 2019, Kayyem was made a contributor by the Washington Post – an appointment that was criticized by Citizen Lab in the context of her role at NSO and the criticism led to Kayyem stepping down just days later. In February 2020, Kayyem also left her role at NSO.

== Early life and education ==
Born in Los Angeles to Lebanese parents, Kayyem graduated from Harvard University with her bachelor's degree in 1991 and from Harvard Law School with a Juris Doctor degree in 1995.

== Career ==
=== Government ===
Kayyem began her legal career in 1995 at the Department of Justice, ultimately serving as an advisor to Attorney General Janet Reno until 1999. From 1999 to 2000, Kayyem served as House Minority Leader Richard Gephardt's appointee to the National Commission on Terrorism, a congressionally mandated review of how the government could better prepare for the growing terrorist threat. Chaired by L. Paul Bremer, that commission's recommendations in the year 2000 urged the nation to recognize and adapt to the growing tide of terrorist activity against the United States.

==== Department of Homeland Security ====
Kayyem was appointed as Massachusetts' first Undersecretary for Homeland Security by Governor Deval L. Patrick in January 2007, overseeing the National Guard, the commonwealth's strategic security planning, and the distribution of homeland security funds consistent with the Governor's priorities.

On March 5, 2009, United States Department of Homeland Security Secretary Janet Napolitano appointed Juliette N. Kayyem Assistant Secretary for Intergovernmental Affairs. On May 7, 2015, United States Department of Homeland Security Secretary Jeh Johnson appointed Kayyem to the Homeland Security Advisory Committee.

==== 2014 Massachusetts gubernatorial candidacy ====
In July 2013, it was reported that Kayyem was considering a bid for Governor of Massachusetts in the 2014 election. On August 21, 2013, Kayyem officially announced her candidacy. As a candidate, Kayyem endorsed raising the state minimum wage and an earned sick day mandate for workers. In February 2014, it was reported by The Boston Globe that Kayyem failed to vote in either 2009 and 2010. At the time she was living temporarily in Washington, D.C., and did not ask for an absentee ballot for Massachusetts or register to vote in the District of Columbia. When asked about her voting record, Kayyem's spokesman initially stated that Kayyem had registered in the District of Columbia during those years. But records later showed that Kayyem was never registered in Washington. When confronted with this evidence, Kayyem's campaign spokesman stated that Kayyem didn't think she could vote in Massachusetts during the time in Washington. At the state party convention on June 14, 2014, Kayyem failed to receive the 15% of delegate votes required to make the primary ballot.

=== Academia ===
Since 2001, Kayyem has been a resident scholar at the Belfer Center for Science and International Affairs, serving both as executive director of the Kennedy School's Executive Session on Domestic Preparedness, a terrorism and homeland security research program, and as co-director of Harvard's Long-Term Legal Strategy for Combating Terrorism. She also taught courses on law and national security. As of fall 2011, Kayyem has returned to the Kennedy School as a lecturer in public policy. She is a member of the Belfer Center board of directors, and Faculty Co-Chair, Dubai Initiative.

=== Private sector ===
Until February 2020, Kayyem was a senior advisor to NSO Group, an Israeli technology firm known for its Pegasus spying tool. The company has been suspected of providing spying software that may have been used in targeted attacks against human rights activists and journalists in various countries.

In October 2017, Kayyem became the chief executive officer of Massachusetts-based Zemcar, an on-demand and scheduled ridesharing company focused on children and seniors. Zemcar discontinued its rideshare services in December 2018. As of March 2019, Kayyem has been chief executive officer of Grip Mobility, a technology company focused on providing transparency in the rideshare industry.

=== Media ===
Named one of CNN/Fortune Magazine's "People to Watch," Kayyem served as an on-air analyst for NBC, MSNBC News, and CNN. Her bi-weekly Boston Globe column is distributed through the New York Times wire service. She was a finalist for the 2013 Pulitzer Prize for Commentary "for her colorful, well reported columns on an array of issues, from women in combat to oil drilling in Alaska."

On October 21, 2019, Kayyem was hired as an opinion contributor by The Washington Post, where Jamal Khashoggi worked as a columnist. Observers pointed out the problematic nature of the hire due to her employment at NSO Group. The director of Citizen Lab, a laboratory that studies human rights abuses and technology told Forbes at the time: "It is a sad day for human rights, a deeply disturbing irony in the wake of Khashoggi's execution, and a public relations victory for NSO Group, to have the Washington Post hire someone sitting on their advisory board." Kayyem stepped down from her Washington Post role four days later, on October 25. In February 2020, Kayyem stepped down from her role as a senior adviser at NSO.

During the blockade of the Ambassador Bridge by truckers in February 2022, Kayyem was accused of promoting vigilantism when she tweeted "The Ambassador Bridge link constitutes 28% of annual trade movement between US and Canada. Slash the tires, empty gas tanks, arrest the drivers, and move the trucks." Addressing the criticism, she denied the accusation, saying, "People have the freedom to protest. Governments have the responsibility to protect public safety. That was what I intended to say."

== Personal life ==
She is married to David J. Barron, a judge on the First Circuit Court of Appeals. She served on the advisory board of the Qatari-government financed International Centre for Sport Security.

== Honors and awards ==
In 2019, Kayyem was named one of Inc. Magazine's "Top 100 Female Founders" for her work with Grip Mobility and her leadership in entrepreneurship. In January 2023, she received the Pinnacle Leadership Award from the Greater Boston Chamber of Commerce in recognition of her public service and business leadership.

== Selected works ==
=== Books ===
- Kayyem, Juliette N.; Pangi, Robyn L. (2003). First to Arrive: State and Local Responses to Terrorism (with Robyn L. Pangi). The MIT Press. ISBN 0-262-11281-7.
- Heymann, Philip B.; Kayyem, Juliette N. (2005). Protecting Liberty in an Age of Terror (with Philip Benjamin Heymann). The MIT Press. ISBN 0-262-08343-4.
- Kayyem, Juliette (2016). Security Mom: An Unclassified Guide to Protecting Your Home and Our Homeland. Simon and Schuster. ISBN 978-1476733746.
- Alan Bersin, Chappell Lawson, Juliette N. Kayyem (2020). Beyond 9/11; Homeland Security for the Twenty-First Century, MIT Press, ISBN 9780262361330
- Kayyem, Juliette (2022). The Devil Never Sleeps: Learning to Live in an Age of Disasters. ISBN 9781541700109.

== See also ==
- Preparedness paradox
