= Underpowered =

Underpowered may refer to:

- Underpowered (statistics)
- Underpowered (game design)
