= Equivalents of the Axiom of Choice =

Mathematics book

- Title page for Equivalents of the Axiom of Choice (1963)
- Author: Herman Rubin; Jean E. Rubin
- Language: English
- Series: Studies in Logic and the Foundations of Mathematics
- Release number: 34
- Publisher: North-Holland
- Publication date: 1963

Equivalents of the Axiom of Choice is a book in mathematics, collecting statements in mathematics that are true if and only if the axiom of choice holds. It was written by Herman Rubin and Jean E. Rubin, and published in 1963 by North-Holland as volume 34 of their Studies in Logic and the Foundations of Mathematics series. An updated edition, Equivalents of the Axiom of Choice, II, was published as volume 116 of the same series in 1985.

== Topics ==
At the time of the book's original publication, it was unknown whether the axiom of choice followed from the other axioms of Zermelo–Fraenkel set theory (ZF), or was independent of them, although it was known to be consistent with them from the work of Kurt Gödel. This book codified the project of classifying theorems of mathematics according to whether the axiom of choice was necessary in their proofs, or whether they could be proven without it. At approximately the same time as the book's publication, Paul Cohen proved that the negation of the axiom of choice is also consistent, implying that the axiom of choice, and all of its equivalent statements in this book, are indeed independent of ZF.

The first edition of the book includes over 150 statements in mathematics that are equivalent to the axiom of choice, including some that are novel to the book. This edition is divided into two parts, the first involving notions expressed using sets and the second involving classes instead of sets. Within the first part, the topics are grouped into statements related to the well-ordering principle, the axiom of choice itself, trichotomy (the ability to compare cardinal numbers), and Zorn's lemma and related maximality principles. This section also includes three more chapters, on statements in abstract algebra, statements for cardinal numbers, and a final collection of miscellaneous statements. The second section has four chapters, on topics parallel to four of the first section's chapters.

The book includes the history of each statement, and many proofs of their equivalence. Rather than ZF, it uses Von Neumann–Bernays–Gödel set theory for its proofs, mainly in a form called NBG^{0} that allows urelements (contrary to the axiom of extensionality) and also does not include the axiom of regularity.

The second edition adds many additional equivalent statements, more than twice as many as the first edition, with an additional list of over 80 statements that are related to the axiom of choice but not known to be equivalent to it. It includes two added sections, one on equivalent statements that need the axioms of extensionality and regularity in their proofs of equivalence, and another on statements in topology, mathematical analysis, and mathematical logic. It also includes more recent developments on the independence of the axiom of choice, and an improved account of the history of Zorn's lemma.

== Audience and reception ==
This book is written as a reference for professional mathematicians, especially those working in set theory. Reviewer Chen Chung Chang writes that it "will be useful both to the specialist in the field and to the general working mathematician", and that its presentation of results is "clear and lucid". By the time of the second edition, reviewers J. M. Plotkin and David Pincus both called this "the standard reference" in this area.
