= Denominator neglect =

Cognitive bias

Denominator neglect, also known as denominator neglect bias or the ratio bias, is a cognitive bias in which individuals focus on the numerator of a ratio while neglecting the denominator. This leads to systematic errors in decision-making and probability judgments. It is especially common when people are asked to assess risks, probabilities, or benefits based on proportions.

== Overview ==
Denominator neglect occurs when individuals give disproportionate weight to the number of outcomes of interest (the numerator) while failing to adequately consider the total number of possible outcomes (the denominator). As a result, they may incorrectly perceive a situation as more or less likely, or more or less beneficial, than it actually is.

For example, people may perceive a medical treatment that saves 100 lives out of 700 (14%) as more effective than one that saves 90 lives out of 400 (22.5%), because they focus on the larger numerator (100) rather than the more favorable success rate.

The phenomenon is closely related to ratio bias, where people prefer options with larger absolute numbers even when the proportional value is lower.

== Psychological basis ==
Denominator neglect is grounded in dual-process theories of cognition, particularly the distinction between System 1 (fast, intuitive thinking) and System 2 (slow, deliberate reasoning). According to this model, denominator neglect arises from reliance on System 1, which emphasizes vivid, concrete quantities (like “number of lives saved”) over abstract ratios or percentages.

This bias is considered a form of attribute substitution, where people unconsciously substitute a complex question (e.g., “Which treatment is more effective?”) with a simpler one (“Which saves more lives?”).

== Experimental evidence ==
Denominator neglect has been extensively demonstrated in laboratory experiments. A seminal study by Denes-Raj and Epstein (1994) found that participants were more likely to draw from a bowl containing 9 red beans out of 100 rather than from one with 1 red bean out of 10, despite the latter having a higher probability of winning a prize (10% vs. 9%)—because they perceived 9 winning beans as a better option.

Other studies have replicated this effect in contexts such as:

- Health risk perception (e.g., side effects of medication)
- Lottery judgments
- Policy decision-making
- Public understanding of statistics in media

== Real-world implications ==
Denominator neglect has practical consequences in a wide range of domains:

- Medical decision-making: Patients may misjudge risks of treatments or side effects when statistics are framed in frequencies rather than probabilities.
- Public policy: Policy support can be influenced by how outcomes are framed, such as focusing on the number of lives saved instead of mortality rates.
- Education and numeracy: Low statistical literacy contributes to the persistence of this bias; interventions aimed at improving numeracy have been shown to reduce it.

== Mitigation ==
Several strategies can reduce denominator neglect:

- Presenting data in percentage formats instead of raw frequencies.
- Using visual aids such as pie charts or icon arrays to depict ratios.
- Encouraging deliberative thinking through numeracy training and cognitive reflection tasks.

== See also ==
- Base rate neglect
- Framing effect
- Statistical reasoning
- Availability heuristic
