= B. L. S. Prakasa Rao =

Indian mathematician

- Born: 6 October 1942 (age 83)
- Education: Michigan State University; Indian Statistical Institute; Andhra University
- Awards: Shanti Swarup Bhatnagar Award (1982); P. V. Sukhatme Prize (2008)
- Scientific career
- Fields: Mathematics; Statistics
- Doctoral advisor: Herman Rubin

Bhagavatula Lakshmi Surya Prakasa Rao is an Indian statistician. He was born on 6 October 1942 in Porumamilla, Andhra Pradesh. He completed his B.A. (Honours) course in Mathematics from Andhra University in 1960 and moved to the Indian Statistical Institute, Kolkata, where he completed his M.Stat in Statistics in 1962. He graduated with a Ph.D in Statistics in 1966 from Michigan State University under Herman Rubin. He won the Shanti Swarup Bhatnagar Prize for Science and Technology in Mathematical Sciences in 1982 from the Government of India, the Outstanding Alumni award from the Michigan State University in 1996, and the National Award in memory of P V Sukhatme in 2008 from the Government of India. The Indian Society for Probability and Statistics awarded him the C R Rao Lifetime Achievement Award in 2022. He is an elected Fellow of the Institute of Mathematical Statistics (1983), Indian National Science Academy (1984), Indian Academy of Sciences (1992), and National Academy of Sciences (1993).

== Academic life ==
He worked at the Indian Institute of Technology, Kanpur at the beginning of his career and later moved to Indian Statistical Institute, New Delhi. He was a Distinguished Scientist and Director of the Indian Statistical Institute, Kolkata from 1992 to 1995. He also held visiting professorships at the University of California, Berkeley, University of Illinois, University of Wisconsin, Purdue University, University of California, Davis and University of Iowa. He has held the Jawaharlal Nehru Chair Professorship (2006–08), Dr. Homi J. Bhabha Chair Professorship (2008–12) at the University of Hyderabad, and the Ramanujan Chair Professorship (2012–17) at CR Rao Advanced Institute of Mathematics, Statistics and Computer Science. Professor Prakasa Rao served as an INSA Senior Scientist at the CR Rao Advanced Institute of Mathematics, Statistics and Computer Science (CR Rao AIMSCS) from 2018 to 2023. He is currently an Emeritus Professor of the Indian Statistical Institute, and an INSA Honorary Scientist at the CR Rao AIMSCS.

== Books ==
Among the books he has written are:

- Associated Sequences, Demimartingales and Nonparametric Inference, Birkhauser, Springer, Basel (2012), ix +272 pp.
- Statistical Inference for Fractional Diffusion Processes, John Wiley, Chichester (2010), xii +252 pp.
- A First Course in Probability and Statistics, World Scientific, Singapore,(2009). Reprinted by Cambridge University Press India Private Limited, Delhi (2010), xii + 317pp.
- Statistical Inference for Diffusion Type Processes, Arnold, London and Oxford University press, New York (1999), xvi+ 349pp.
- Semimartingales and Their Statistical Inference, Chapman and Hall, London and CRC Press, Boca Raton, Florida (1999), xi+532 pp.
- Identifiability in Stochastic Models: Characterization of Probability Distributions, Academic Press, Cambridge Mass. (1992). xiii + 253 pp.
- Asymptotic Theory of Statistical Inference, Wiley, New York (1987). Reprinted by World Publishing Corporation, Beijing, China (1990). xiv + 438 pp.
- Non-Parametric Functional Estimation, Academic Press, Orlando, Florida (1983). xiv + 522 pp.
- Statistical Inference for Stochastic Processes (jointly with I. V. Basawa), Academic Press, London (1980). xiii + 433 pp.
