= Jean E. Rubin =

American mathematician (1926–2002)

Jean Estelle Hirsh Rubin (October 29, 1926 – October 25, 2002) was an American mathematician known for her research on the axiom of choice. She worked for many years as a professor of mathematics at Purdue University. Rubin wrote five books: three on the axiom of choice, and two more on more general topics in set theory and mathematical logic.

== Education and career ==
Jean Hirsch was born in New York City, graduated from Queens College, City University of New York in 1948, and completed a master's degree at Columbia University in 1949. She did her doctoral studies at Stanford University, during which time she married and changed her name to Jean Rubin. She completed her Ph.D. at Stanford in 1955. Her dissertation, jointly supervised by J.C.C. McKinsey and Patrick Suppes, was Bi-Modal Logic, Double Closure Algebras and Hilbert Space.

She became a lecturer at the University of Oregon and, in 1960, an assistant professor at Michigan State University. In 1967, she moved again, to Purdue University, where she remained for the rest of her career.

== Personal life ==
Rubin was married to statistician Herman Rubin, with whom she wrote two of her books. Their son is mathematician and aerospace engineer Arthur Rubin.

== Books ==
Rubin was the author or co-author of:

- Equivalents of the Axiom of Choice (with Herman Rubin, Studies in Logic and the Foundations of Mathematics 34, North-Holland, 1963; 2nd ed., Studies in Logic and the Foundations of Mathematics 116, 1985)
- Set Theory for the Mathematician (Holden-Day, 1967)
- Mathematical Logic: Applications and Theory (Saunders, 1990)
- Consequences of the Axiom of Choice (with Paul Howard, Mathematical Surveys and Monographs 59, American Mathematical Society, 1998)
