= Arthur Rubin =

American mathematician (born 1956)

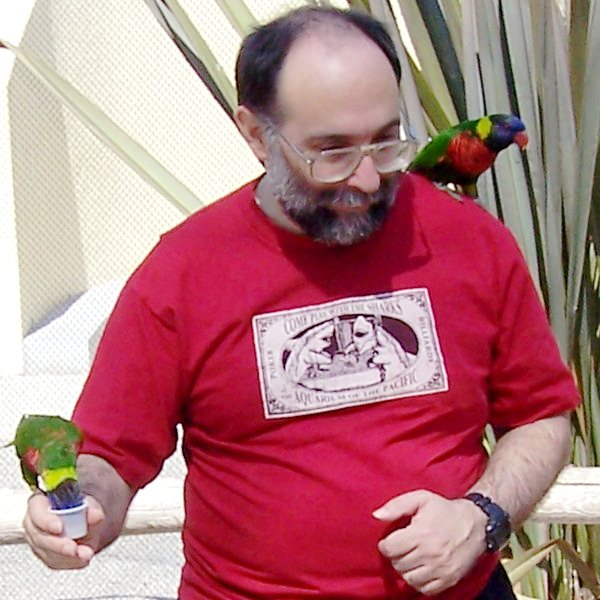
- Rubin at the Aquarium of the Pacific in August 2006
- Born: 1956 (age 69–70)
- Education: Caltech
- Scientific career
- Fields: Mathematics; Aerospace engineering
- Thesis: Free Algebras in Von Neumann–Bernays–Gödel Set Theory and Positive Elementary Inductions in Reasonable Structures (1978)
- Doctoral advisor: Alexander S. Kechris

Arthur Leonard Rubin (born 1956) is an American mathematician and aerospace engineer. He was named a Putnam Fellow on four consecutive occasions from 1970 to 1973.

== Life and career ==
Rubin's mother was Jean E. Rubin, a professor of mathematics at Purdue University, and his father was Herman Rubin, a professor of statistics at the same university. Arthur co-authored his first paper with his mother in 1969 at the age of 13. He earned his Ph.D. at the California Institute of Technology in 1978, under the direction of Alexander S. Kechris.

Rubin unsuccessfully stood as a Libertarian to represent the 55th district in the 1984 California State Assembly elections.

== Awards and honors ==
As an undergraduate, Rubin was named a Putnam Fellow on four occasions, the first time in 1970, aged 14, making him the youngest Fellow to date. In 1972, he tied for third place in the first USA Mathematical Olympiad.

In 1974, Rubin was the subject of an article in the Madison Capital Times, in which his Caltech undergraduate advisor was quoted as saying that someone of Rubin's ability appeared in the United States "about once in every ten years".

== Publications ==
Rubin's dissertation was entitled Free Algebras in Von Neumann–Bernays–Gödel Set Theory and Positive Elementary Inductions in Reasonable Structures. In 1979, Rubin co-authored a paper on list coloring of graphs with Paul Erdős, giving him an Erdős number of 1.

- Rubin, A. L. & Rubin, J. E. (1969). "Extended operations and relations on the class of ordinal numbers". Fundamenta Mathematicae. 65 (2): 227–242. doi:10.4064/fm-65-2-227-242.
- Howard, P. E.; Rubin, A. L. & Rubin, J. E. (1979). "Kinna–Wagner Selection Principles, Axioms of Choice and Multiple Choice". Monatshefte für Mathematik. 123 (4): 309–319. doi:10.1007/BF01326766. S2CID 18138945.
- Posner, E. C. & Rubin, A.L. (1984). "Capacity of digital links in tandem". IEEE Transactions on Information Theory. IT-30 (3): 464–470. Bibcode:1984ITIT...30..464P. doi:10.1109/TIT.1984.1056917.
- Truong, T. K.; Reed, I. S.; Lipes, R. G.; Rubin, A. L. & Butman, S. A. (1984). "Digital SAR processing using a fast polynomial transform". IEEE Transactions on Acoustics, Speech, and Signal Processing. ASSP-32 (2): 419–425. doi:10.1109/TASSP.1984.1164307.
