= Uniformly most powerful test =

Theoretically optimal hypothesis test

In statistical hypothesis testing, a uniformly most powerful (UMP) test is a hypothesis test which has the greatest power $1 - \beta$ among all possible tests of a given size α. For example, according to the Neyman–Pearson lemma, the likelihood-ratio test is UMP for testing simple (point) hypotheses.

== Setting ==
Let $X$ denote a random vector (corresponding to the measurements), taken from a parametrized family of probability density functions or probability mass functions $f_{\theta}(x)$, which depends on the unknown deterministic parameter $\theta \in \Theta$. The parameter space $\Theta$ is partitioned into two disjoint sets $\Theta_0$ and $\Theta_1$. Let $H_0$ denote the hypothesis that $\theta \in \Theta_0$, and let $H_1$ denote the hypothesis that $\theta \in \Theta_1$. The binary test of hypotheses is performed using a test function $\varphi(x)$ with a reject region $R$ (a subset of measurement space).

$$\varphi(x) =
\begin{cases}
1 & \text{if } x \in R \\
0 & \text{if } x \in R^c
\end{cases}$$

meaning that $H_1$ is in force if the measurement $X \in R$ and that $H_0$ is in force if the measurement $X\in R^c$. Note that $R \cup R^c$ is a disjoint covering of the measurement space.

== Formal definition ==
A test function $\varphi(x)$ is UMP of size $\alpha$ if for any other test function $\varphi'(x)$ satisfying

$$\sup_{\theta\in\Theta_0}\; \operatorname{E}[\varphi'(X)|\theta]=\alpha'\leq\alpha=\sup_{\theta\in\Theta_0}\; \operatorname{E}[\varphi(X)|\theta]\,$$

we have

$$\forall \theta \in \Theta_1, \quad \operatorname{E}[\varphi'(X)|\theta]= 1 - \beta'(\theta) \leq 1 - \beta(\theta) =\operatorname{E}[\varphi(X)|\theta].$$

== The Karlin–Rubin theorem ==
The Karlin–Rubin theorem (named for Samuel Karlin and Herman Rubin) can be regarded as an extension of the Neyman–Pearson lemma for composite hypotheses. Consider a scalar measurement having a probability density function parameterized by a scalar parameter θ, and define the likelihood ratio $l(x) = f_{\theta_1}(x) / f_{\theta_0}(x)$. If $l(x)$ is monotone non-decreasing, in $x$, for any pair $\theta_1 \geq \theta_0$ (meaning that the greater $x$ is, the more likely $H_1$ is), then the threshold test:

$$\varphi(x) =
\begin{cases}
1 & \text{if } x > x_0 \\
0 & \text{if } x < x_0
\end{cases}$$
where $x_0$ is chosen such that $\operatorname{E}_{\theta_0}\varphi(X)=\alpha$

is the UMP test of size α for testing $H_0: \theta \leq \theta_0 \text{ vs. } H_1: \theta > \theta_0 .$

Note that exactly the same test is also UMP for testing $H_0: \theta = \theta_0 \text{ vs. } H_1: \theta > \theta_0 .$

== Important case: exponential family ==
Although the Karlin-Rubin theorem may seem weak because of its restriction to scalar parameter and scalar measurement, it turns out that there exist a host of problems for which the theorem holds. In particular, the one-dimensional exponential family of probability density functions or probability mass functions with

$$f_\theta(x) = g(\theta) h(x) \exp(\eta(\theta) T(x))$$

has a monotone non-decreasing likelihood ratio in the sufficient statistic $T(x)$, provided that $\eta(\theta)$ is non-decreasing.

== Example ==
Let $X=(X_0 ,\ldots , X_{M-1})$ denote i.i.d. normally distributed $N$-dimensional random vectors with mean $\theta m$ and covariance matrix $R$. We then have

$$\begin{align}
f_\theta (X) = {} & (2 \pi)^{-MN/2} |R|^{-M/2} \exp \left\{-\frac 1 2 \sum_{n=0}^{M-1} (X_n - \theta m)^T R^{-1}(X_n - \theta m) \right\} \\[4pt]
= {} & (2 \pi)^{-MN/2} |R|^{-M/2} \exp \left\{-\frac 1 2 \sum_{n=0}^{M-1} \left (\theta^2 m^T R^{-1} m \right ) \right\} \\[4pt]
& \exp \left\{-\frac 1 2 \sum_{n=0}^{M-1} X_n^T R^{-1} X_n \right\} \exp \left\{\theta m^T R^{-1} \sum_{n=0}^{M-1}X_n \right\}
\end{align}$$

which is exactly in the form of the exponential family shown in the previous section, with the sufficient statistic being

$$T(X) = m^T R^{-1} \sum_{n=0}^{M-1}X_n.$$

Thus, we conclude that the test

$$\varphi(T) =  \begin{cases} 1 & T > t_0 \\ 0 & T < t_0 \end{cases} \qquad \operatorname{E}_{\theta_0} \varphi (T) = \alpha$$

is the UMP test of size $\alpha$ for testing $H_0: \theta \leqslant \theta_0$ vs. $H_1: \theta > \theta_0$

== Further discussion ==
In general, UMP tests do not exist for vector parameters or for two-sided tests (a test in which one hypothesis lies on both sides of the alternative). The reason is that in these situations, the most powerful test of a given size for one possible value of the parameter (e.g. for $\theta_1$ where $\theta_1 > \theta_0$) is different from the most powerful test of the same size for a different value of the parameter (e.g. for $\theta_2$ where $\theta_2 < \theta_0$). As a result, no test is uniformly most powerful in these situations.
