= Herman Rubin =

American statistician and mathematician (1926–2018)

- Born: October 27, 1926; Chicago, Illinois, US
- Died: April 23, 2018 (aged 91); West Lafayette, Indiana, US
- Citizenship: American
- Education: University of Chicago
- Known for: Karlin-Rubin theorem Rao-Rubin theorems
- Honors: Volume 45 of the IMS Lecture Notes were dedicated to him
- Scientific career
- Fields: Statistics; Mathematical sciences
- Workplaces: Purdue University
- Doctoral advisor: Paul Halmos
- Doctoral students: B. L. S. Prakasa Rao; Herbert Solomon

Herman Rubin (1926–2018) was an American statistician and mathematician, professor at Purdue University. He died in 2018 at the age of 91.

== Education and career ==
Born in 1926 in Chicago, Illinois, Rubin received a high school diploma in at the age of 16 in 1943, and earned his undergraduate and graduate degrees from the University of Chicago, completing his doctorate in mathematics at the age of 21 in 1948; his official advisor was Paul Halmos. He served in the U.S. Army during the Second World War. Prior to joining Purdue University in 1967, Rubin held faculty positions at several other prestigious institutions (Stanford University, the University of Oregon, and Michigan State University).

== Contributions to statistics ==
Rubin was considered a polymath with a unique ability to solve complex problems. He was a prolific researcher, publishing over 130 papers that have become standard texts in various fields. His key contributions include:

- Multivariate Analysis: He co-authored seminal papers with T.W. Anderson on the distribution theory of maximum likelihood estimators in factor analysis and structural equation models.
- Monotone likelihood ratio: He is credited with the widely used and fundamental concept of monotone likelihood ratio families.
- Bayesian Inference: Rubin was a lifelong Bayesian statistician who took the theory and axioms of Leonard Jimmie Savage literally, and he contributed significantly to the theory of Bayes risks.
- Econometrics: He worked on problems related to the simultaneous equations model in economics, including the development of the Limited information maximum likelihood (LIML) estimator.
- Set Theory and Probability: His work also included contributions to set theory, the theory of moderate deviations, and the characterization of probability distributions.
- Hypothesis testing: in collaboration with Samuel Karlin, the Karlin-Rubin theorem provides a method for finding uniformly most powerful tests for one-sided hypotheses, a significant contribution to the theory of hypothesis testing.

He was an inaugural Fellow of the American Mathematical Society and a Fellow of the Institute of Mathematical Statistics.

== Family ==
He was married to Jean E. Rubin (1926–2002), a professor of mathematics at Purdue University whose primary research focus was on the axiom of choice. His son Arthur Rubin (born 1956) is a mathematician and aerospace engineer.

== Legacy ==
A memorial lecture series, the Herman Rubin Memorial Lecture, was established at Purdue University in his honor.
