= The Devil Never Sleeps (Kayyem book) =

2022 book by Juliette Kayyem

The Devil Never Sleeps: Learning to Live in an Age of Disasters
- Author: Juliette Kayyem
- Language: English
- Genre: Non-fiction
- Publisher: PublicAffairs
- Publication date: 2022-03-29
- Publication place: United States
- ISBN: 9781541700109

The Devil Never Sleeps: Learning to Live in an Age of Disasters is a nonfiction book about anticipating disasters, written by Juliette Kayyem and published by PublicAffairs, Kayyem observes that disasters are increasing, inevitable, and managing risk before and after disasters is important. The book also emphasizes situational awareness to help with mitigation.

== Synopsis ==
The author discusses emergency management and disaster preparedness, and how people do not always serve the public’s best interest in a crisis. The work is divided into three major areas: "preparing for and reacting to catastrophic events, minimizing harm, and applying information gleaned from present-day disasters to those of the future."

The book emphasizes the importance of "situational awareness," and asserts that major events like Hurricane Katrina, and the January 6 Capitol attack could have been handled better if better preparation had been made. Minimizing cascading failure is a concept that is delved into, where preparation is made this in turns prevents further loss (fewer deaths from IEDs with better medical response). An example of tragedy from lack of preparation is seen from the 2011 Tōhoku earthquake and tsunami which in turn caused the Fukushima Daiichi nuclear disaster.

Learning from disasters is important, like how people reacted to the 2004 tsunami and how changing people’s behaviors can save lives. Another topic discussed in the book is the "preparedness paradox", where something like the Year 2000 problem doesn't happen because of preparedness, leaving everyone to wonder whether the preparation was really necessary.

== About the author ==
In 2009 United States Department of Homeland Security Secretary Janet Napolitano appointed Kayyem Assistant Secretary for Intergovernmental Affairs. As Assistant Secretary, Kayyem was responsible for coordinated and consistent planning between the Department and all of its state, local, tribal, and territorial partners on issues like immigration, intelligence sharing, military affairs, border security, and the response to operational events such as H1N1 influenza outbreak, the December 25th attempted terrorist attack, the Haiti earthquake, and the BP oil spill.

Kayyem is a lecturer in public policy at the Kennedy School of Harvard University. Since 2001, Kayyem has been a resident scholar at the Belfer Center, serving both as executive director of the Kennedy School's Executive Session on Domestic Preparedness, a terrorism and homeland security research program, and as co-director of Harvard's Long-Term Legal Strategy for Combating Terrorism. She also taught courses on law and national security.

== Reviews ==
Kirkus Reviews called the book, "an urgent, useful survival manual for our time." Publishers Weekly said that the work is, "full of practical advice and incisive analysis, this is an astute and timely road map for mitigating the consequences of the next cataclysm."
