= Self-defeating prophecy =

Prediction that prevents what it predicts from happening

A self-defeating prophecy (self-destroying or self-denying in some sources) is the complementary opposite of a self-fulfilling prophecy; a prediction that prevents what it predicts from happening. This is also known as the prophet's dilemma.

A self-defeating prophecy can be the result of rebellion to the prediction. If the audience of a prediction has an interest in seeing it falsified, and its fulfillment depends on their actions or inaction, their actions upon hearing it will make the prediction less plausible. If a prediction is made with this outcome specifically in mind, it is commonly referred to as reverse psychology or warning. Also, when working to make a premonition come true, one can inadvertently change the circumstances so much that the prophecy cannot come true.

It is important to distinguish a self-defeating prophecy from a self-fulfilling prophecy that predicts a negative outcome. If a prophecy of a negative outcome is made, and that negative outcome is achieved as a result of positive feedback, then it is a self-fulfilling prophecy. For example, if a group of people decide they will not be able to achieve a goal and stop working towards the goal as a result, their prophecy was self-fulfilling. Likewise, if a prediction of a negative outcome is made, but the outcome is positive because of negative feedback resulting from the rebellion, then that is a self-defeating prophecy.

== Examples ==
- If an economic crisis is predicted, then consumers, manufacturers and authorities will respond to avoid economic loss, breaking the chain of events that would lead to crisis.
- The biblical prophet Jonah famously ran away and refused to deliver God's prophecy of Nineveh's destruction, lest the inhabitants repent and cause God to forgive them and not destroy the city. Indeed, when Jonah eventually did deliver the prophecy, the people did mend their ways and caused the prophesied event not to happen.
- The Year 2000 problem has been cited as a self-defeating prophecy, in that fear of massive technology failures caused by computers' internal clocks "rolling over" encouraged the very changes needed to avoid those failures.
- Pre-announcing products in a way that discourages current sales (the Osborne effect) is also an example of a self-defeating prophecy.
- Predictions of environmental issues are sometimes corrected via legislation or behavior change and thus never happen.
- Epidemics with grim projections also encourage changes that can prevent those projections from coming true and in turn lead to people questioning the necessity of those changes because the projections did not come true.

== See also ==
- Catch-22 (logic), a logical trap in which the participant is forced into the same outcome regardless of choice
- Preparedness paradox, a perception that successful planning means the planned-for danger was smaller than it was
- Self-refuting idea, a logical statement that negates itself
- Grandfather Paradox, similar paradox for time travel
