= Size (statistics) =

In statistics, the size of a test is the probability of falsely rejecting the null hypothesis. That is, it is the probability of making a type I error. It is denoted by the Greek letter α (alpha).

For a simple hypothesis,

$$\alpha = P(\text{test rejects } H_0 \mid H_0).$$

In the case of a composite null hypothesis, the size is the supremum over all data generating processes that satisfy the null hypotheses.

$$\alpha = \sup_{h\in H_0} P(\text{test rejects } H_0 \mid h).$$

A test is said to have significance level $\alpha$ if its size is less than or equal to $\alpha$. In many cases the size and level of a test are equal.
