= Yekutieli =

Yekutieli is a Hebrew surname. Notable people with the surname include:

- Addam Yekutieli a.k.a. Know Hope (born 1986), a contemporary artist whose work consists of social practice projects, immersive installations, and public artworks
- Amnon Yekutieli (born 1959), an Israeli mathematician
- Yosef Yekutieli (1897 – 1982), a prominent member of the international Jewish sports organisation Maccabi, the founder of the Maccabiah, Israel Football Association, and the Israel Olympic Committee
- Daniel Yekutieli, an Israeli statistician
