= ISDS (disambiguation) =

ISDS refers to investor-state dispute settlement, an instrument of public international law.

ISDS may also refer to:

- Inadvertent Separation Destruct System
- Integrated Software Dependent System
- International Serials Data System
- International Sheep Dog Society
- International Society for Disease Surveillance
