= James Robins =

American epidemiologist

James M. Robins
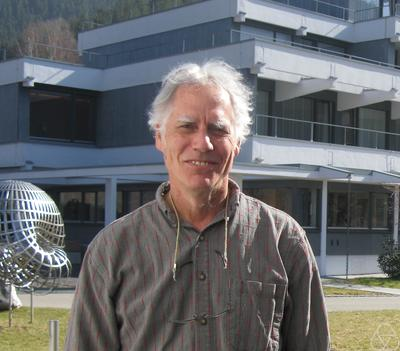
- Robins at the Mathematical Research Institute of Oberwolfach in 2012
- Education: Washington University in St. Louis; Harvard University
- Awards: Nathan Mantel Award (2013), Rousseeuw Prize for Statistics (2022), National Academy of Sciences (2026)
- Scientific career
- Fields: Epidemiology Biostatistics
- Workplaces: Harvard School of Public Health

James M. Robins is an epidemiologist and biostatistician best known for advancing methods for drawing causal inferences from complex observational studies and randomized trials, particularly those in which the treatment varies with time. He received the Nathan Mantel Award for lifetime achievement in statistics and epidemiology in 2013 and the 2022 Rousseeuw Prize in Statistics, jointly with Miguel Hernán, Eric Tchetgen-Tchetgen, Andrea Rotnitzky and Thomas Richardson. In 2026 he was elected to the National Academy of Sciences.

He graduated in medicine from Washington University in St. Louis in 1976. He is currently Mitchell L. and Robin LaFoley Dong Professor of Epidemiology at Harvard T.H. Chan School of Public Health. He has published over 100 papers in academic journals and is an ISI highly cited researcher.

== Biography ==
Robins attended Harvard College with the class of 1971, concentrating in mathematics and philosophy. He was elected to Phi Beta Kappa, but did not graduate. He went on to attend Washington University School of Medicine, graduating in 1976, and practiced Occupational Medicine for several years. While working in occupational medicine, he attended basic courses in applied medical statistics at the Yale School of Public Health, but quickly came to the conclusion that the methodology used at the time was insufficiently rigorous to support causal conclusions.

== Research ==
In 1986, Robins introduced a new framework for drawing causal inference from observational data. In this and other articles published around the same time, Robins showed that in non-experimental data, exposure is almost always time-dependent, and that standard methods such as regression are therefore almost always biased. This framework is mathematically very closely related to Judea Pearl's graphical framework Non-Parametric Structural Equations Models, which Pearl developed independently shortly thereafter. Pearl's graphical models are a more restricted version of this theory.

In his original paper on causal inference, Robins described two new methods for controlling for confounding bias, which can be applied in the generalized setting of time-dependent exposures: The G-formula and G-Estimation of Structural Nested Models. Later, he introduced a third class of models, Marginal Structural Models, in which the parameters are estimated using inverse probability of treatment weights. He has also contributed significantly to the theory of dynamic treatment regimes, which are of high significance in comparative effectiveness research and personalized medicine. Together with Andrea Rotnitzky and other colleagues, in 1994 he introduced doubly robust estimators (derived from the influence functions) for statistical parameters in causal inference and missing data problems. The theory for doubly robust estimators has been highly influential in the field of Causal_inference and has influenced practice in computer science, biostatistics, epidemiology, machine learning, social sciences, and statistics. In 2008, he also developed the theory of higher-order influence functions for statistical functional estimation with collaborators including Lingling Li, Eric Tchetgen Tchetgen, and Aad van der Vaart.

== Selected publications ==
- Robins, J.M. (1989). "The control of confounding by intermediate variables". Statistics in Medicine. 8 (6): 679–701. doi:10.1002/sim.4780080608. PMID 2749074.
- Robins, J.M.; Tsiatis, A.A. (1991). "Correcting for non-compliance in randomized trials using rank preserving structural failure time models". Communications in Statistics - Theory and Methods. 20 (8): 2609–2631. doi:10.1080/03610929108830654.
- Robins, J.M. (1994). "Correcting for non-compliance in randomized trials using structural nested mean models". Communications in Statistics - Theory and Methods. 23 (8): 2379–2412. doi:10.1080/03610929408831393.
- Robins, J.M. (1997). "Causal inference from complex longitudinal data". In M. Berkane (ed.). Latent Variable Modeling and Applications to Causality. Lecture Notes in Statistics. Vol. 120. Springer-Verlag. pp. 69–117.
- Robins, J.M.; Ritov, Y. (1997). "Toward A Curse Of Dimensionality Appropriate (CODA) Asymptotic Theory For Semi-parametric Models". Statistics in Medicine. 16 (3): 285–319. doi:10.1002/(SICI)1097-0258(19970215)16:3<285::AID-SIM535>3.3.CO;2-R. PMID 9004398.
- Robins, J.M. (1998). "Correction for non-compliance in equivalence trials". Statistics in Medicine. 17 (3): 269–302. doi:10.1002/(SICI)1097-0258(19980215)17:3<269::AID-SIM763>3.0.CO;2-J. PMID 9493255.
- Robins, J.M.; Hernan, M.A.; Brumback, B. (2000). "Marginal Structural Models and Causal Inference in Epidemiology". Epidemiology. 11 (5): 550–560. CiteSeerX 10.1.1.116.7039. doi:10.1097/00001648-200009000-00011. JSTOR 3703997. PMID 10955408. S2CID 8907527.
- van der Laan, M.J.; Robins, J.M. (2003). Unified Methods for Censored Longitudinal Data and Causality. Springer Series in Statistics. Springer. ISBN 978-0-387-95556-8.
