= Ruth Heller (statistician) =

Israeli statistician

- רות הלר
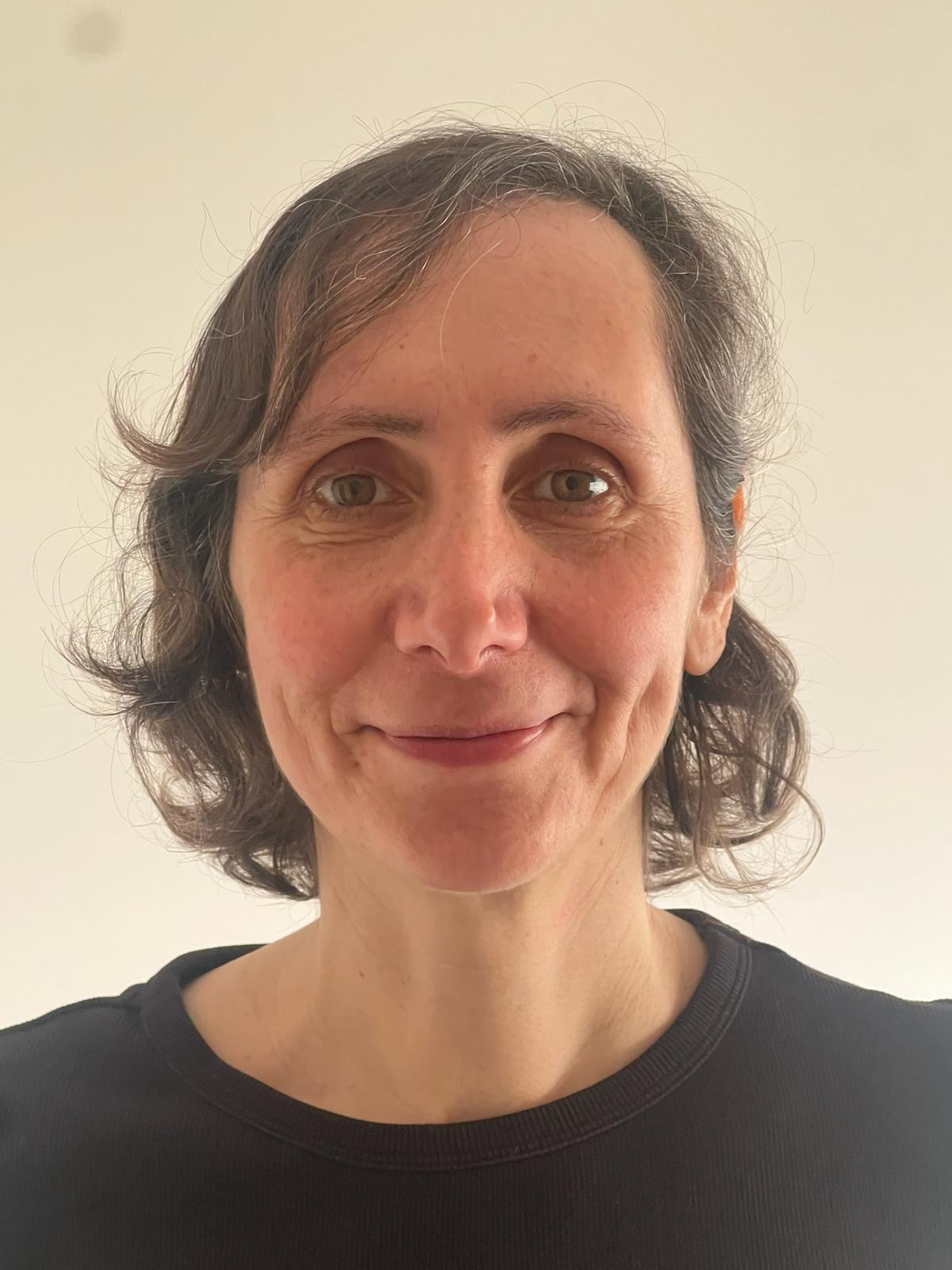
- Awards: Rousseeuw Prize for Statistics (2024)

Academic background
- Education: McGill University (BSc); University of Washington (MSc); Tel Aviv University (PhD)
- Thesis: Statistical Issues Related to fMRI Experiments (2007)
- Doctoral advisor: Yoav Benjamini

Academic work
- Institutions: Tel Aviv University

Ruth Heller (Hebrew: רות הלר) is an Israeli statistician and professor at Tel Aviv University. Heller focuses on diverse areas of statistics and biostatistics, including multiple comparisons, selective inference, conformal inference, and study reproducibility.

She earned a BSc in mathematics from McGill University in 1996, and a MSc in biostatistics from the University of Washington in 1998. She earned a PhD from Tel Aviv University in 2007. Her advisors were Yoav Benjamini and Felix Abramovich.

She was a visiting lecturer at the University of Pennsylvania from 2007 to 2009. In 2011, she joined the Department of Statistics and Operations Research at Tel Aviv University as a senior lecturer. In 2016, she was appointed associate professor, and in 2021, she was appointed full professor.

== Honors and awards ==
Together with Yoav Benjamini and Daniel Yekutieli, she won the Rousseeuw Prize for Statistics in 2024 "for the pioneering work on the false discovery rate and methods to control it".
