= Structural model =

Structural model may refer to:

- Structural model of the psyche, a Freudian model of psychology
- Structural equation modeling, mathematical, statistical and computer algorithm models that fit constructs to data
- Structural model (software), a diagram that the describes the static structure of a computer program
- Marginal structural model, a class of statistical models used in epidemiology
- An approach to credit spread-modelling; see under Merton model.
