= Rousseeuw Prize for Statistics =

Statistical research award

The Rousseeuw Prize for Statistics
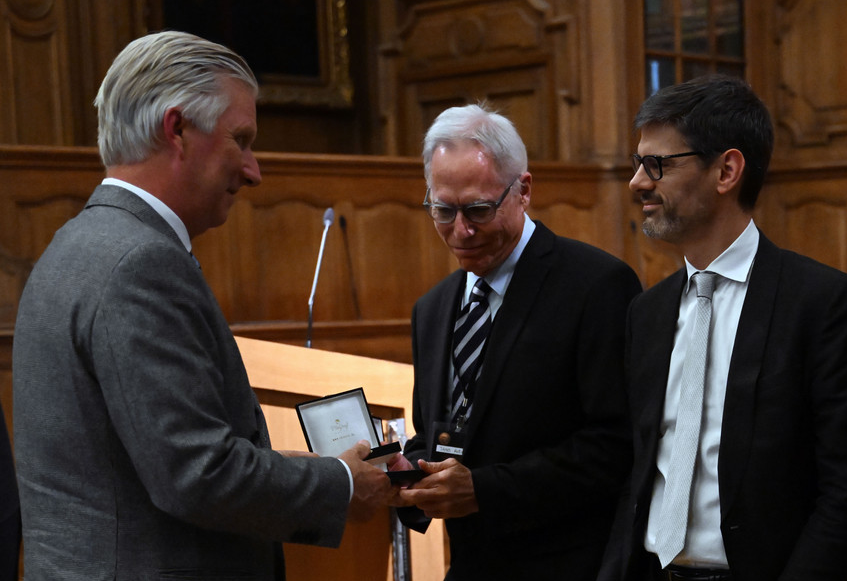
- King Philippe handing out the first Rousseeuw Prize
- Awarded for: innovations in statistical research with impact on statistical practice and society
- Country: Belgium
- Presented by: The King Baudouin Foundation; The Rousseeuw Foundation
- Rewards: A medal, a certificate, and a monetary award of US$1,000,000
- First award: 2022
- Website: rousseeuwprize.org

The Rousseeuw Prize for Statistics awards innovations in statistical research with impact on society. This biennial prize is awarded in even years, and consists of a medal, a certificate, and a monetary reward of US$1,000,000, similar to the Nobel Prize in other disciplines. The home institution of the Prize is the King Baudouin Foundation (KBF) in Belgium, which appoints the international jury and carries out the selection procedure. The award money comes from the Rousseeuw Foundation created by the statistician Peter Rousseeuw.

== History ==
The first Rousseeuw Prize was awarded on October 12, 2022, at KU Leuven, presented by King Philippe of Belgium. The awarded topic was Causal Inference with application in Medicine and Public Health, with laureates James Robins, Andrea Rotnitzky, Thomas Richardson, Miguel Hernán and Eric Tchetgen Tchetgen.

The second Rousseeuw Prize was awarded on December 3, 2024 for work on The False Discovery Rate and Methods to Control It, with laureates Yoav Benjamini, Ruth Heller, and Daniel Yekutieli.

The third Rousseeuw Prize was awarded in 2026 to The R Project, see also R (programming language). Half of the prize money goes to the five laureates Brian D. Ripley, Martin Maechler, Kurt Hornik, Peter Dalgaard, and Luke Tierney. The second half goes to the other members of the R Core Team.

== Laureates ==
Year	Laureate	Institution	Country	Awarded innovation
2022	James Robins	Harvard School of Public Health	United States	"For their pioneering work on causal inference with applications in medicine and public health."
2022	Andrea Rotnitzky	Torcuato di Tella University	Argentina	"For their pioneering work on causal inference with applications in medicine and public health."
2022	Thomas Richardson	University of Washington	United States	"For their pioneering work on causal inference with applications in medicine and public health."
2022	Miguel Hernán	Harvard School of Public Health	United States	"For their pioneering work on causal inference with applications in medicine and public health."
2022	Eric Tchetgen	Wharton School of the University of Pennsylvania	United States	"For their pioneering work on causal inference with applications in medicine and public health."
2024	Yoav Benjamini	Tel Aviv University	Israel	"For the pioneering work on the false discovery rate and methods to control it."
2024	Ruth Heller	Tel Aviv University	Israel	"For the pioneering work on the false discovery rate and methods to control it."
2024	Daniel Yekutieli	Tel Aviv University	Israel	"For the pioneering work on the false discovery rate and methods to control it."
2026	Brian Ripley	University of Oxford	England	For "building R, the open-source language that has become the common foundation of modern statistical computing."
2026	Martin Mächler	ETH Zurich	Switzerland	For "building R, the open-source language that has become the common foundation of modern statistical computing."
2026	Kurt Hornik	Wirtschaftsuniversität Wien	Austria	For "building R, the open-source language that has become the common foundation of modern statistical computing."
2026	Peter Dalgaard	Copenhagen Business School	Denmark	For "building R, the open-source language that has become the common foundation of modern statistical computing."
2026	Luke Tierney	University of Iowa	United States	For "building R, the open-source language that has become the common foundation of modern statistical computing."

Nominations for the prize are submitted to its website together with letters of recommendation. The organizers of the prize and its ceremony are Mia Hubert and Stefan Van Aelst.

== See also ==
- International Prize in Statistics
- COPSS Presidents' Award
- COPSS Distinguished Achievement Award and Lectureship
