= History of the Maccabiah Games =

The History of the Maccabiah, a quadrennial International Jewish multi-sport event, dates back to 1912 and the Games of the V Olympiad.

== History ==
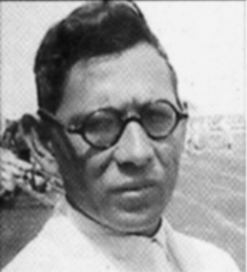
Yosef Yekutieli during the 1st Maccabiah.

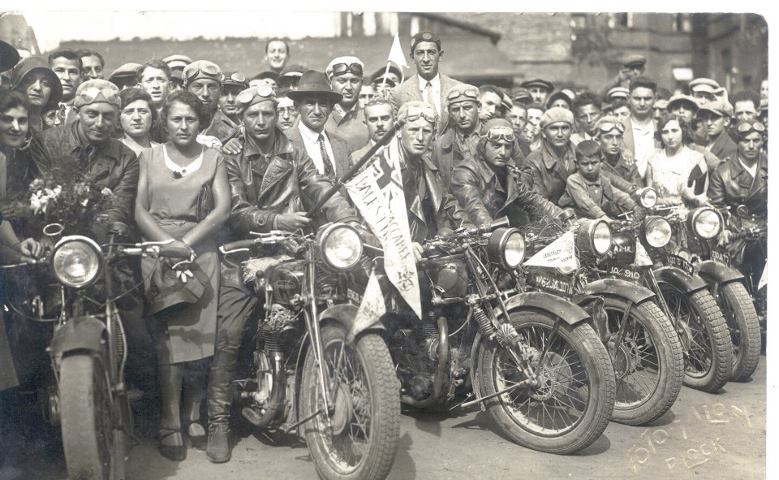
Bikers during the opening parade of the 1st Maccabiah; 1932. Such motorcyclists were instrumental in spreading the word about the upcoming Jewish Olympics across Europe.

At the end of the 19th century, Jews in Europe weren't allowed to take part in official athletic competitions and were forbidden membership in sports associations. The vision for the Maccabiah started with Yosef Yekutieli, a Russian Jew who immigrated to Palestine in 1909 with his family. In 1912 Yekutieli obtained a booklet about the Stockholm Olympics which listed many Jewish athletes who participated in the name of their country and the medals they won. This booklet was the origin of Yekutieli's idea: To help Jewish athletes participate in the Olympics.

With the start of World War I, Yekutieli was drafted into the Turkish army. Upon his return to Mandatory Palestine in 1918, Yekutieli returned to his job at the Eretz Yisrael Office. For almost a decade Yekutieli thought of ways to make his idea a reality, however, it wasn't until 1928 when Yekutieli presented his Jewish Olympics proposal to Menachem Ussishkin, the chairman of the executive committee of the Jewish National Fund. As a way to promote interest, Yekutieli proposed that the First Maccabiah should take place in time for the 1800th anniversary of the Bar Kochba Rebellion.

Coincidentally, at about the same time, the Maccabi World Union was trying to come up with a way to allow athletes living in the Mandatory Palestine to participate in important international sporting events, a way that would also act as a form of international recognition of Palestine as the Jewish National Home. In 1929 Yekutieli went to Czechoslovakia to present his proposal in front of the Maccabi World Congress where his proposal was met with great enthusiasm by the Jewish community both in the diaspora and among the Jewish population in Israel. A committee was formed for the Maccabiah. The first Maccabiah, called the Maccabiada (Hebrew: המכביאדה), was organized with the help of many different sports organizations, including the recently created Israeli Football Association, and devoted volunteers. Many of the tasks such as improvising sports sites and mobilize financial resources were driven by volunteers. Local communities took it upon themselves to raise the money to build a stadium in Tel Aviv, the Maccabiah Stadium. The last obstacle the committee had to overcome was the High Commissioner for Palestine, Sir John Chancellor. While Chancellor admired some Zionist leaders, his general attitude towards Jews was negative. Chancellor refused to approve the Maccabiah.

=== Approval of the Games & the Motorbikes Tour ===
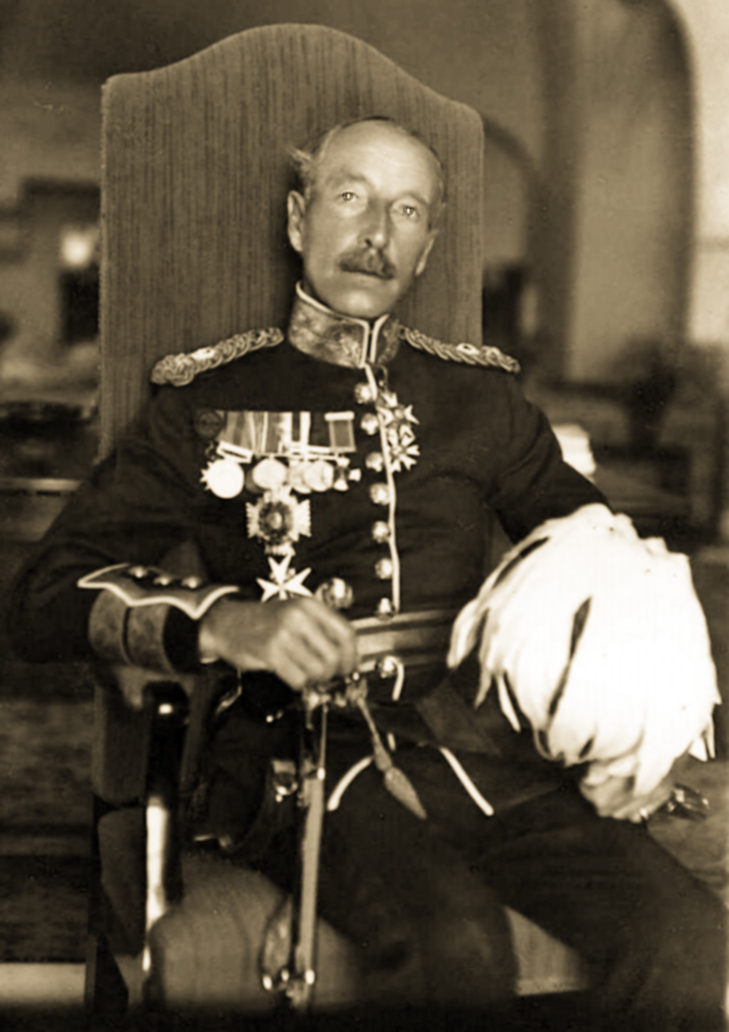
High Commissioner of Mandatory Palestine, Sir Arthur Grenfell Wauchope; image 1920–1940.

The Maccabiah, could not take place without the approval of the British Palestine High Commissioner. In the fall of 1931, the United Kingdom appointed Sir Arthur Grenfell Wauchope as the new High Commissioner of Palestine. Wauchope, who showed great admiration to Zionist Palestine as well as the Jewish sports movement in general, approved the Maccabiah on the condition that it also host Arab and official British Mandate athletes in addition to Jewish sportsmen. The conditions were agreed on and the Maccabiada was scheduled for March 1932.

With the news of Wauchope's approval of the games, two separate delegations of Jewish motor-bikers set off from Tel Aviv on a promotional tour to the Jewish communities across Europe, where the vast number of Jews were living at the time. In 1930, one delegation left Tel Aviv to Antwerp, Belgium. A year later a second delegation left Tel Aviv for London. Yekutieli also toured with that delegation. On a second tour, May 10 through July 16, 1931, the intrepid band of Maccabiah bikers covered roughly 5,825 miles (9,375 kilometers) from Tel Aviv to Egypt and via ship to many of the big cities in Europe including Nuremberg, Paris, and London. At the end of the tour, the group returned to Israel via Beirut.

== The Maccabiada ==
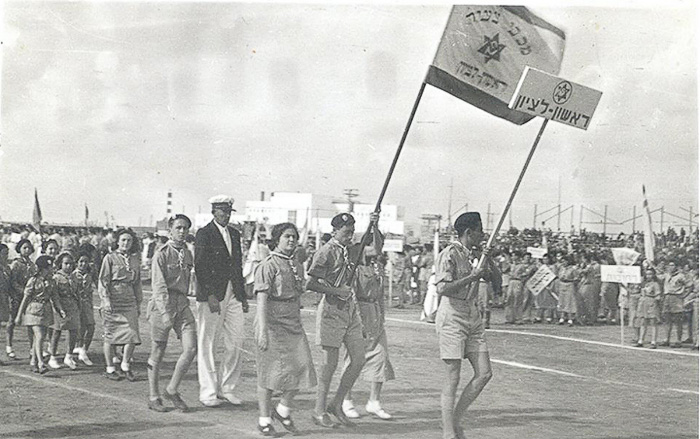
The Rishon LeZion delegation to the 1st Maccabiah; 1932.

The 1st Maccabiah opened on March 28, 1932. The Games were nicknamed "White Horse Olympics" because Tel Aviv's Mayor Meir Dizengoff led a parade honoring the Games through the city streets while riding a white horse. During these first games 390 sportsmen took part from 18 countries. The games included everything from swimming, football, and handball, to various athletics. The games were regarded as a great success and planning for its successor were already on their way by the end of that year.

== Olympic Committee & 2nd Maccabiah ==
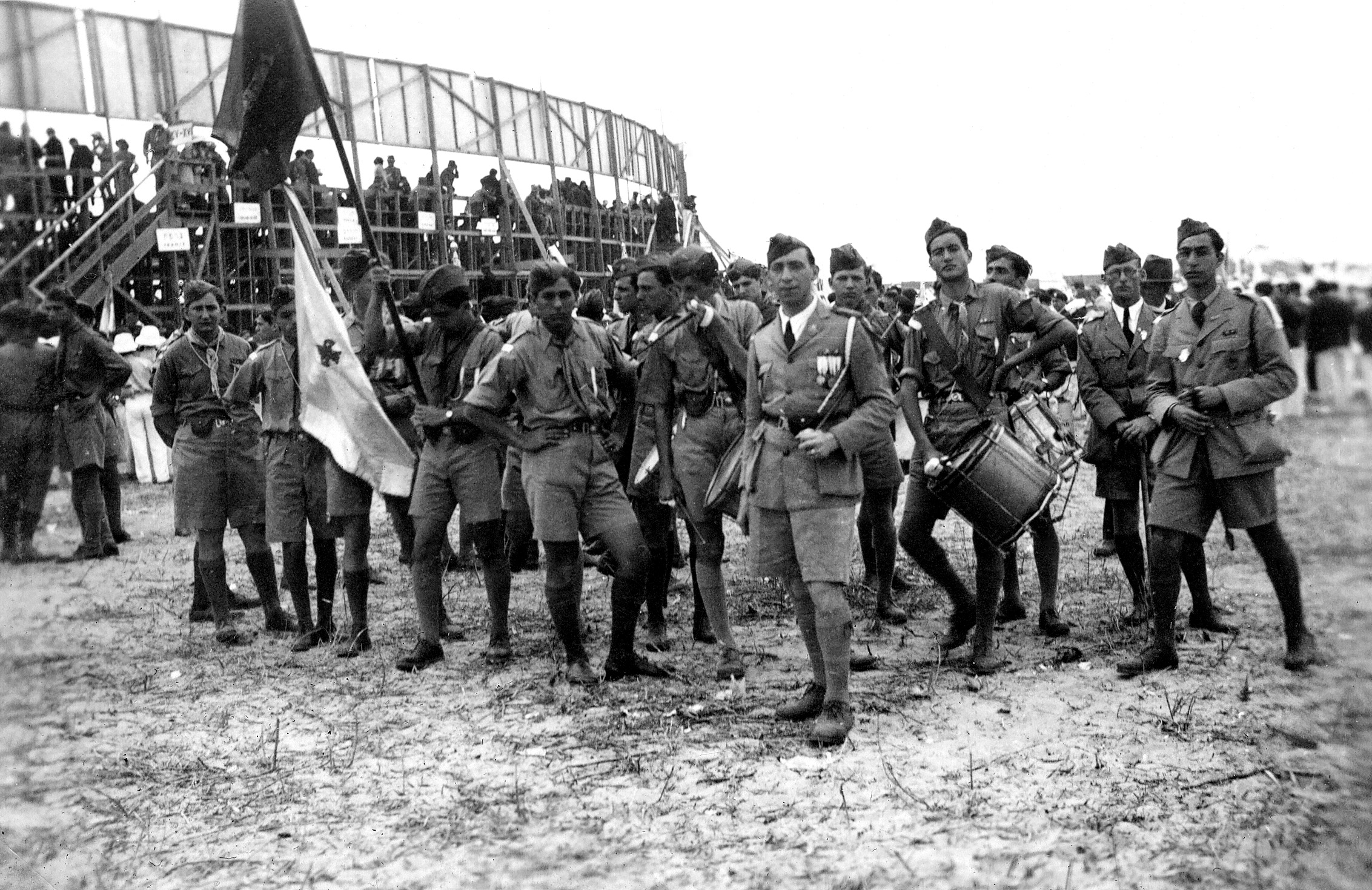
The Egyptian delegation waits for the cue to enter the stadium, 2nd Maccabiah opening ceremony.

With the success of the first games, in 1933, with the help of Maccabi, Yekutieli founded the Palestine Olympic Committee which later became the Israel Olympic Committee. Israel was formally invited to participate in the 1936 Olympics in Berlin - an invitation that was refused due to the growing fear of Nazi Germany. Instead, Yekutieli decided to proceed with a second Maccabiah.

The second Maccabiah were held on from April 2 to 10, 1935 despite official opposition by the British Mandatory government. The games were held after only three years instead of four as was customary in the Olympics. They decided on three years in order to not make it look like they were imitating the Olympics. Additionally, the Maccabiah served a more important goal - during the first Maccabiah a large portion of the athletes stayed in Israel, effectively bypassing the British White Paper. The organizers were hoping the second Maccabiah would function as a way to allow more athletes to make Aliyah. During the second games over 1,300 athletes from 28 nations participated.

== 3rd Maccabiah ==
Yosef Sprinzak, first Speaker of the Knesset, during the opening ceremony of the 3rd Maccabiah.

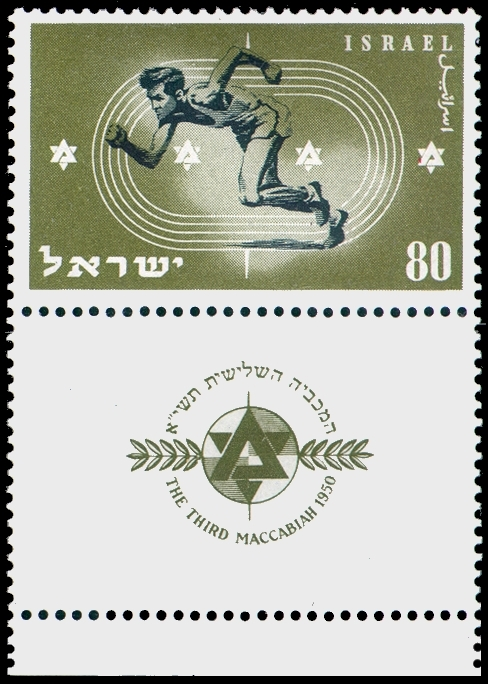
Israeli postal stamp, 1950

Following the success of the 2nd Maccabiah, the 3rd Maccabiah was originally scheduled to be held in sprint of 1938. However, due to British concerns that the games would once again create large-scale illegal immigration, especially in light of the spread of Nazism in Germany and Europe the games were cancelled indefinitely. Following the outbreak of World War II and later during the War of Independence, the games were postponed even further.

It was not until 1950 that the games were renewed. The 3rd Maccabah took place during the Jewish holiday of Sukkot from September 27 to October 8, 1950. The games were the first international sporting event to take place in The State of Israel. The games served as a confluence of all outstanding Jewish athletes from around the world, after a 15-year break. The games also served a significant milestone in the life of the Jewish people, after The Holocaust and the 1947–1949 Palestine war. During those games, many prominent Jewish athletes from Eastern Europe were conspicuously absent. Some were killed in the Holocaust and the remaining were banned from participating by the communist regimes of their countries. The Maccabiah opening ceremony took place in a new 50,000-seat stadium in Ramat Gan that was especially built for the games.

== 4th Maccabiah to present day ==
The fourth Maccabiah took place during Sukkot of 1953. The games grew to almost 2,000 athletes from over 20 countries. Following the 4th Maccabiah, it was decided that the Maccabiah be held every four years like the Olympics to gain Olympic recognition. The games were then changed to take place quadrennially on the year following the Olympics - a change that's been in effect ever since.

The most recent games, the 21st Maccabiah took place between July 12 to 26, 2022.

== The Maccabiah and the Aliyah ==
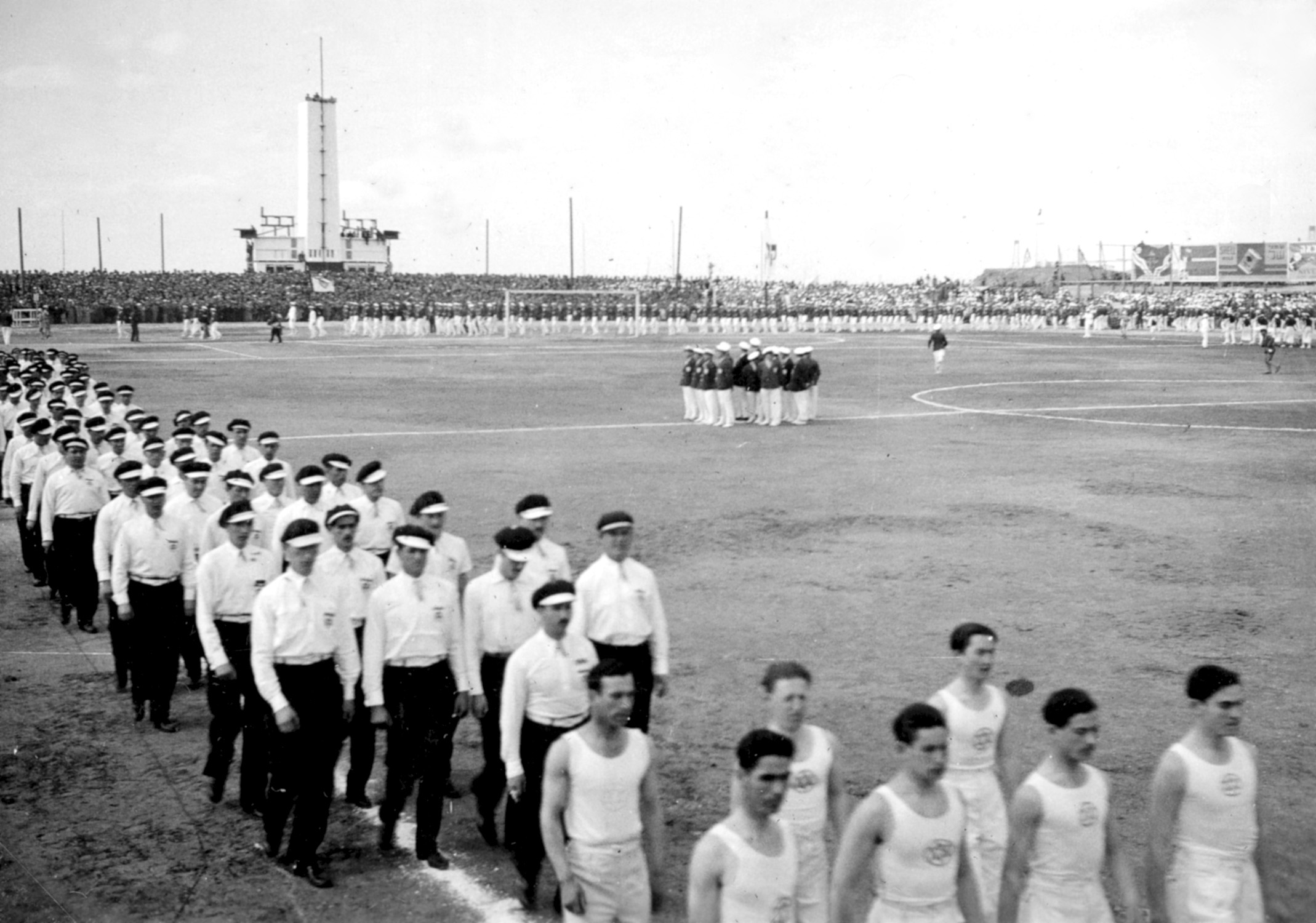
The Bulgarian athletes parading in the stadium at the 2nd Maccabiah Games opening ceremony, most of which stayed in Eretz Yisrael after the games.

The early Maccabiah games that took place in 1932 and 1935 served as a way to illegally bring Jews to Israel and to effectively bypass the limited Jewish immigration permitted by British authorities in the same period. It was for that reason, the 2nd Maccabiah was nicknamed "Aliyah Olympics". Some notable delegations to the 2nd Maccabiah completely stayed in the land of Israel after the games. Most notable, the Bulgarian delegation that brought 350 Jews, athletes, their family members, and an orchestra, which arrived in Jaffa Port, returned to Sofia, Bulgaria empty, sending only their equipment back. It is one of the reasons the British authority at the time refused to allow the 3rd Maccabiah to take place in the spring of 1938. The tradition of making an Aliyah continued onward during the 1950s with the 3rd and 4th Maccabiah games. Today, Jews who want to make Aliyah to Israel often do so during the Maccabiah.
