= Jonathan Marchini =

Professor of Statistical Genomics

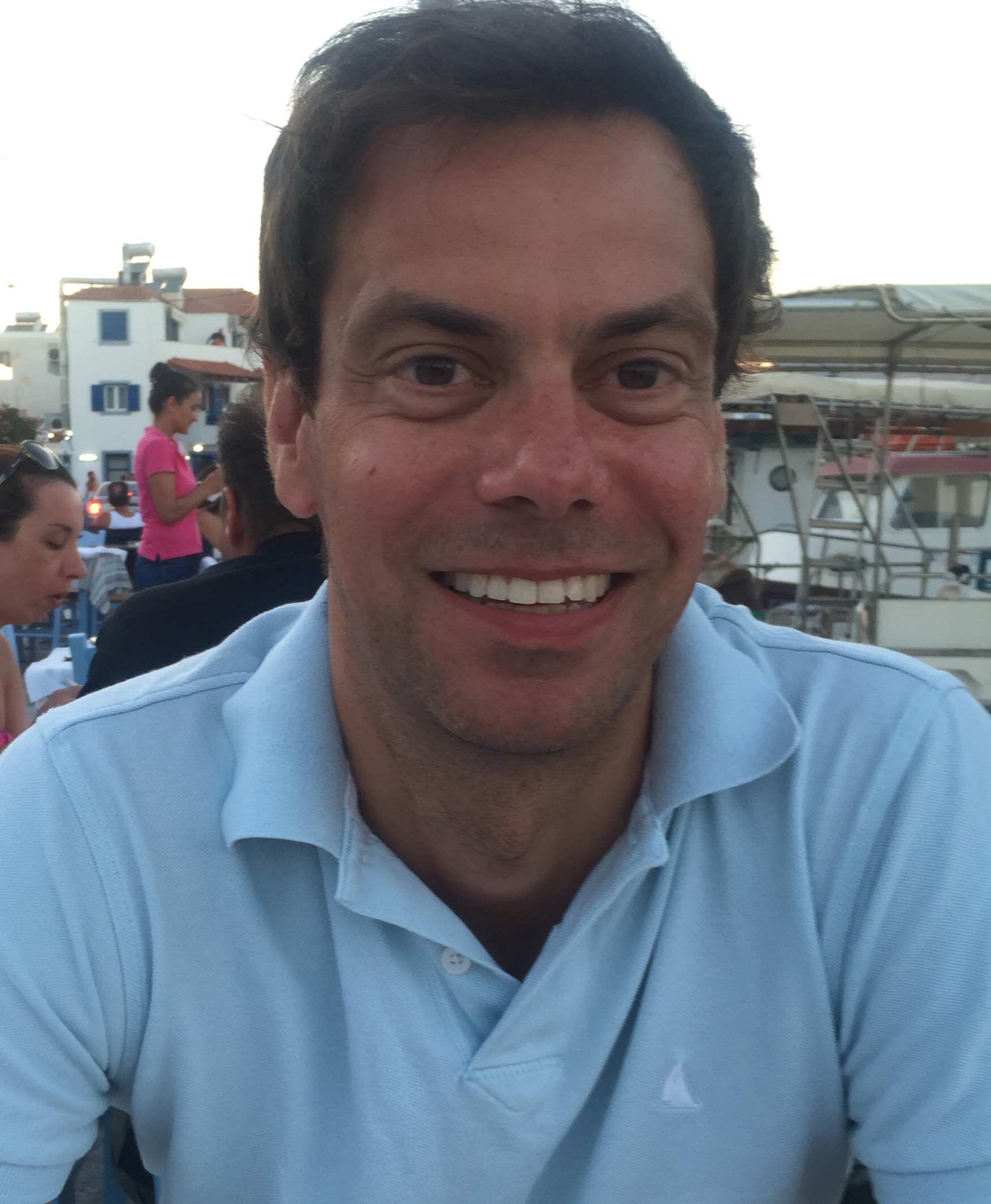
- Born: Jonathan Laurence Marchini; Chichester
- Education: University of Exeter (BSc); University of Oxford (DPhil)
- Awards: Philip Leverhulme Prize (2013)
- Scientific career
- Workplaces: University of Oxford
- Thesis: The Statistical Analysis of Brain Images (2002)
- Doctoral advisor: Brian Ripley
- Website: jmarchini.org

Jonathan Laurence Marchini (born 19 May 1973) is a Bayesian statistician and professor of statistical genomics in the Department of Statistics at the University of Oxford, a tutorial fellow in statistics at Somerville College, Oxford and a co-founder and director of Gensci Ltd. He co-leads the Haplotype Reference Consortium.

== Education ==
He obtained a Bachelor of Science degree in Pure Mathematics and Mathematical Statistics from Exeter University (1991–94). He then obtained a PGCE in Mathematics Education from the West Sussex Institute of Higher Education (1994–95). He completed his DPhil in the Department of Statistics at the University of Oxford supervised by Professor Brian Ripley (1998–2002).

== Career and research ==
Marchini spent three years working as a VSO volunteer teaching A-level Mathematics at Tosamaganga Secondary school, near Iringa, Tanzania, between September 1995 and September 1998.

From 2002 to 2005 he held a Wellcome Trust Training Fellowship in Mathematical Biology, under the supervision of Prof Lon Cardon and Prof Peter Donnelly.

In 2006 he was appointed as a university lecturer (associate professor) in statistical genomics in the Department of Statistics at the University of Oxford and a senior research fellow at Mansfield College. In 2007 he became an affiliated group leader at the Wellcome Trust Center of Human Genetics at the University of Oxford. In 2010 he was re-appointed until retirement

In 2015 he was promoted to professor of statistical genomics

Marchini's research focusses on statistical genetics and population genetics, with a particular emphasis on methods development for genome-wide association studies. He has worked on haplotype estimation, genotype imputation, genotype calling from arrays and sequencing, sparse tensor decomposition for RNA-seq datasets, population structure, phenotype prediction and mixed models, gene–gene interactions and brain imaging genetics.

He was a member of the analysis team for the International HapMap Project, the Wellcome Trust Case-Control Consortium, the 1000 Genomes Project and the UK10K Project. His research group was responsible for the haplotype estimation and genotype imputation for the UK Biobank dataset. He co-leads the Haplotype Reference Consortium.

He has been an ISI Highly Cited Researcher from 2014-2018

He has acted as an expert witness in a patent trial

== Awards ==
In 2012 he was awarded a Philip Leverhulme Prize for "leading the way by constructing powerful and ingenious novel statistical methodology for population and medical genetics, together with associated fast computational algorithms and software."
