= Miguel Hernán =

Spanish-American epidemiologist

Miguel Hernán is a Spanish–American epidemiologist. He is Director of CAUSALab, Kolokotrones Professor of Biostatistics and Epidemiology at the Harvard T.H. Chan School of Public Health, and Member of the Faculty at the Harvard–MIT Program in Health Sciences and Technology.

Hernán conducts research to learn what works to improve human health. Together with his collaborators from several countries, he designs analyses of healthcare databases, epidemiologic studies, and randomized trials. He is in the 1% of Highly Cited Researchers since 2017. His free edX course Causal Diagrams has had over 80,000 registrations. His book Causal Inference: What If, co-authored with James Robins is also freely available online and widely used for the training of researchers.

Hernán is a Methods Editor for Annals of Internal Medicine, Editor Emeritus of Epidemiology (journal) and past Associate Editor of Biometrics (journal), American Journal of Epidemiology, and the Journal of the American Statistical Association. He has been a special Government employee of the U.S. Food and Drug Administration and has served on several committees of the National Academies of Sciences, Engineering, and Medicine of the United States.

== Education ==
- Licenciado en Medicina, 1995, Universidad Autónoma de Madrid, Spain
- Master of Public Health (Quantitative Methods), 1996, Harvard University, USA
- Master of Science (Biostatistics), 1999, Harvard University, USA
- Doctor of Public Health (Epidemiology), 1999, Harvard University, USA

== Honors and awards ==
- Fellow, La Caixa Foundation, 1995–1997
- Fellow, American Association for the Advancement of Science (AAAS), elected in 2012
- MERIT Award, National Institute of Allergy and Infectious Diseases, U.S. National Institutes of Health, 2018
- Fellow, American Statistical Association, elected in 2019
- 2022 Alumni Prize, Universidad Autónoma de Madrid
- 2022 Rousseeuw Prize for Statistics, King Baudouin Foundation, Belgium (jointly with James Robins, Thomas Richardson, Andrea Rotnitzky and Eric Tchetgen Tchetgen)

=== Scientific articles ===
- Runner-up to Best Research Report, Health Research Training Program, New York City Department of Health, 1994
- Kenneth Rothman Epidemiology Prize, Epidemiology (journal), 2005 (first author), 2021 (co-author)
- Top 10 Article of the Year, American Journal of Epidemiology, 2014, 2015, 2016
- Award for Outstanding Research Article in Biosurveillance (Category: Impact on the field, 2nd prize), International Society for Disease Surveillance, 2016
- Influential Paper, American Journal of Epidemiology Centennial: first author and co-author of 2 of 4 selected influential articles published in the first 100 years of the journal
