= Gil Z. Hochberg =

Israeli-American scholar

Gil Z. Hochberg is an Israeli-American scholar. She is currently the Ransford Professor of Hebrew and Visual Studies, Comparative Literature, and Middle East Studies at Columbia University.

== Early life ==
Hochberg was born in Israel. Her father is Israeli statistician and professor Yosef "Yossi" Hochberg. Her stepfather is Israeli historian Yaron Tsur. She studied philosophy at Tel Aviv University.

== Career ==
Hochberg has written three academic books: Becoming Palestine: Towards an Archival Imagination of The Future (2021), Visual Occupations: Vision and Visibility in a Conflict Zone (2015), and In Spite of Partition: Jews, Arabs and the Limits of Separatist Imagination (2007) as well as several art catalogs. She previously taught for 15 years at UCLA. Her 2026 book, My Father, the Messiah: A Memoir (2026), traces her relationship with her father.

Hochberg identifies as a feminist, queer, Jewish anti-Zionist. Her statements on Israel were criticized by Karys Rhea in The Tower.

== Bibliography ==
- In Spite of Partition: Jews, Arabs, and the Limits of Separatist Imagination (Princeton University Press, 2007)
- Visual Occupations: Vision and Visibility in a Conflict Zone (Duke University Press, 2015)
