= Andrea Rotnitzky =

Argentine biostatistician

Andrea Gloria Rotnitzky is an Argentine biostatistician whose research involves causal inference on the effects of medical interventions in the face of missing data. She is Prentice Endowed Professor of Biostatistics in the University of Washington School of Public Health.

== Education and career ==
Rotnitzky earned a licenciate in mathematics in 1982 at the University of Buenos Aires. She went to the University of California, Berkeley for graduate study in statistics, earning a master's degree in 1986 and completing her Ph.D. in 1988. Her dissertation, Analysis of Generalized Linear Models for Cluster Correlated Data, was supervised by Nicholas P. Jewell.

After postdoctoral research in the Harvard T.H. Chan School of Public Health, Rotnitzky continued at Harvard as an assistant professor of biostatistics from 1989 to 1995, associate professor from 1995 to 2000, and senior lecturer from 2000 to 2005. Meanwhile, she joined the department of economics at Torcuato di Tella University in Buenos Aires as an associate professor from 2000 to 2005, and as a full professor from 2005 to 2022.

In 2022-23 she held the Prentice Endowed Professor of Biostatistics at the University of Washington School of Public Health.

== Recognition ==
Rotnitzky was one of the five inaugural winners of the Rousseeuw Prize for Statistics, in 2022, given to her with James Robins, Thomas Richardson, Miguel Hernán, and Eric Tchetgen Tchetgen, "for their pioneering work on causal inference with applications in medicine and public health". In 2023 she was granted the Konex Award Merit Diploma for her work in Mathematics in the last decade. In 2026 she was granted the Konex Platinum Award for her work in quantitative methods in the last decade.

In 2025, Rotnitzky was named a Fellow of the Institute of Mathematical Statistics, "for groundbreaking contributions to semiparametric theory for causal inference and missing data analysis, the development of doubly robust estimation, the integration of semiparametric efficiency theory with causal graphical models".
