= Ahuzat Bayit =

Neighborhood in Tel Aviv

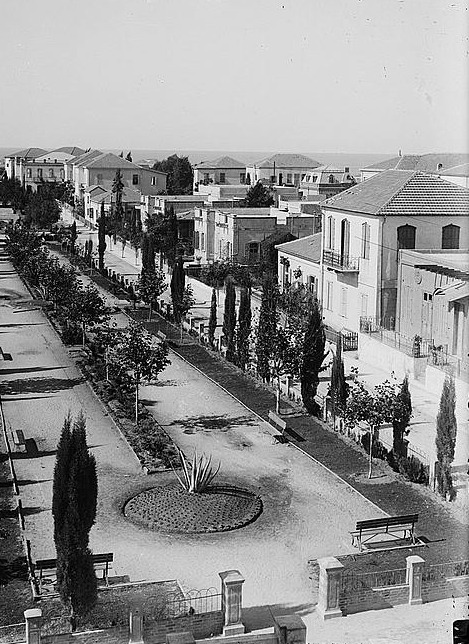
Aerial photo from around 1920-30

Ahuzat Bayit was a Jewish neighborhood founded outside the walls of Jaffa in 1909. The date of its establishment is considered the founding date of the city of Tel Aviv.

== Planning of the neighborhood ==
On July 5, 1906, about 120 Jews from Jaffa gathered at the "Yeshurun" club and founded the Ahuzat Bayit Association. The association elected a committee, headed by the architect Akiva Aryeh Weiss, who was tasked with planning the neighborhood. Committee members also included Dov Berger, Yitzhak Hayutman, Yehezkel Danin (Sukobolski), and David Smilansky.

The neighborhood was built adjacent to the existing Jewish neighborhoods Neve Tzedek and Neve Shalom. The vision of the neighborhood, as published in the association's promotional leaflet, stated:

"Just as the city of New York marks the main gateway to America, so must we enhance our city, and it will one day become the New York of the Land of Israel."

Sixty members joined the association and together contributed 100,000 francs to its treasury. An additional 300,000 francs were received as a loan from the Jewish National Fund, which faced criticism for providing such a large sum for urban construction.

Disagreements arose among the association's members regarding the location and size of the land to purchase for the construction of homes. Some feared financial complications and sought only to provide for themselves – that is, a fine home for the sixty founding families alone. They therefore preferred a small plot offered for sale in Jaffa. Ultimately, the members decided to purchase the land of Kerem Jibli – a large tract, distant from Jaffa, which would allow for future expansion. The purchase was carried out with the assistance of Aharon Meir Mazia and David Yellin, who also purchased nearby plots for themselves and voluntarily assisted the association.

The members faced a difficulty: the Ottoman authorities prohibited Jews from purchasing land. Therefore, Jacobus Henricus Kann, a Dutch citizen, financier, and Zionist activist, purchased about sixty plots in his own name for the Jewish settlers of Ahuzat Bayit. The kushan (ownership deed) was issued in August 1908, following the restoration of the Ottoman constitution the previous month.

An initial plan for the neighborhood was prepared by Joseph Treidel. The plan included running water in the homes – a major innovation in the Land of Israel at the time. Later, Wilhelm Stiassny was also asked to join the planning team.

It was also decided that streets would be named after Zionist leaders. The association sought proposals for the name of the neighborhood. In HaTzvi, claims were published alleging that certain individuals were exploiting the association for personal gain. The newspaper printed rebuttals and counter-claims in response.

== Founding of the neighborhood ==
“Land-lottery event of Ahuzat Bayit" (also known as the "Seashell lottery") was a formative event in the history of the city of Tel Aviv, marking its founding day.

On April 11, 1909, after nearly three years of ongoing effort, the members of the Ahuzat Bayit Association gathered on the sandy dunes of lands purchased at Kerem Jabali, with the declared aim of establishing the first Hebrew city. The purchased land was divided simply into plots on either side of one central street, Herzl Street, and four smaller streets crossing it. To distribute the plots equitably among the 66 founding families, it was decided to hold a draw. The draw was organised by Akiva Aryeh Weiss, who chaired the association. The method used was original: dark seashells and white seashells, bearing plot-numbers and family names, respectively, were placed in two boxes, and a child selected one shell from each box in turn. According to the memoirs of Kadish Yehudah-Leib Silman, the child was Moshe Fogel, the eight-year-old son of Abraham and Rivka Fogel.

This day was later recognized as the official founding of Tel Aviv. A water well was later dug on the site. Philanthropist Jacob Moser donated funds for the construction of the Herzliya Gymnasium.

=== Location ===
The site of the land-lottery became one of the most emblematic places in the city and even in Israel. The lottery was held, as stated, on the dunes, in the centre of the land purchased by the association. The location where the participants stood later became part of Rothschildu Boulevard, created as part of the leveling of the sand-hills. At this place the first water-tower of Ahuzat Bayit was erected, and beneath it a small "Committee House" operated – which later became the seat of the Tel Aviv municipality.

A few metres opposite this point stood the home of Meir Dizengoff, the city's first mayor. The plot of this house, like the others, was drawn by lottery, but it became an important site in young Tel Aviv. After his death the house became the Tel Aviv Museum, and 39 years later declared independence by David Ben-Gurion was ceremonially read there. On the boulevard in front of the house, at the location of the former water-tower, a large crowd gathered on the day of the declaration of independence. A year after the establishment of the state, the monument to the founders of Tel Aviv was erected there, which still stands today.

=== Documentation of the event ===
The event was photographed by Abraham Soskin and the photograph is among the most famous in Tel Aviv's history. In the photo, all the founding families are seen clustered around the lottery on a completely desolate area of dunes.

Tel Aviv was founded on sand-hills. Kerem Jabali, the tract acquired by the founders of Ahuzat Bayit, at that time was an area of dunes, vines and sea-willow trees. A few hundred metres from the site at that period stood the houses of the Jewish neighbourhoods Shev-Zay, Neve Tzedek and Neve Shalom, yet to reach Ahuzat Bayit or Jaffa one had to cross sand-hills and the path in those days was dangerous. On the border of Ahuzat Bayit was the Jaffa–Jerusalem railway line. To the east were orchards and farmland.

The association still held significant land for sale to those able to pay in cash. By May 1909, earth leveling had already begun. Most homes were built of local sandstone, as was common at the time. Construction progressed rapidly; by January 1910, the first residents began moving into their homes. By Shevat 5670 (1910), around sixty homes stood on the dunes. On May 21, 1910, it was decided to rename Ahuzat Bayit as Tel Aviv, as proposed by Menachem Sheinkin, after the Hebrew title of Theodor Herzl’s novel Altneuland, translated by Nahum Sokolow.

== The city of Tel Aviv ==
The Hebrew city of Tel Aviv was officially established in 1909 with the founding of Ahuzat Bayit. However, Jewish neighborhoods on this site had begun developing outside Jaffa's walls 22 years earlier, and the city's civic infrastructure began forming even earlier within the Jewish community of Jaffa.

On July 19, 1920, Sir Herbert Samuel, the first British High Commissioner, visited these neighborhoods and expressed support for separating them administratively from Jaffa. As a result, on May 11, 1921, he signed the "Tel Aviv Township Order," which united the Jewish neighborhoods outside Jaffa under the municipal name Tel Aviv.

In 1934, the local council of Tel Aviv was officially recognized as a city by the British Mandate authorities.
