= Marginal structural model =

Statistical models in epidemiology

Marginal structural models are a class of statistical models used for causal inference in epidemiology. Such models handle the issue of time-dependent confounding in evaluation of the efficacy of interventions by inverse probability weighting for receipt of treatment, they allow us to estimate the average causal effects. For instance, in the study of the effect of zidovudine in AIDS-related mortality, CD4 lymphocyte is used both for treatment indication, is influenced by treatment, and affects survival. Time-dependent confounders are typically highly prognostic of health outcomes and applied in dosing or indication for certain therapies, such as body weight or lab values such as alanine aminotransferase or bilirubin.

The first marginal structural models were introduced in 2000. The works of James Robins, Babette Brumback, and Miguel Hernán provided an intuitive theory and an easy-to-implement software which made them popular for the analysis of longitudinal data.
