= Integrated Software Dependent System =

Integrated Software Dependent Systems (ISDS) is an offshore oil IT system standard (DNV-OS-D203) and recommended practice guideline (DNV-RP-D201) covering systems and software verifications and classification of any integrated system that utilizes extensive software control. The ISDS Recommended Practice (DNV-RP-D201) was launched in 2008 by Det Norske Veritas (DNV), the Norwegian classification society. DNV Offshore Standard OS-D203 launched in April 2010.

Since the ISDS standard was first published by DNV, it has been applied by several oil companies, equipment suppliers, ship, and rig owners. The ISDS standard focuses on how to set up and run a project and how to develop system and software quality assurance processes that will last the lifetime of the unit (ship, rig etc.). It provides a framework for working systematically to achieve the required reliability, availability, maintainability, and safety for the integrated unit of software dependent systems.

The process typically starts when owners are specifying their requirements, either for a new project or an enhancement to an existing system. In collaboration with DNV specialists, the owner can assess the integrator and the suppliers to ensure they have the prerequisites for delivering good quality software. One of the innovations of ISDS is that it assigns systems and software responsibilities to one or more of the roles: owner, operator, system integrator, suppliers, and independent verifier.

Another important feature of ISDS is that it requires the designation of a system integrator. This can be the shipbuilder, the major automation supplier, or a specialized contractor. The ISDS defines the activities to be performed by the system integrator. These activities focus on managing requirements and interfaces among the different systems.

The ISDS-required practices for suppliers focus on ensuring that software quality is built into vendor’s products through systematic reviews, inspections, and testing. All of these requirements are generally accepted good practices in software engineering. Nothing revolutionary is demanded.

Among the rig-owners, Songa Offshore, Seadrill and Dolphin Drilling have been early adopters of the ISDS approach. DNV conducted a pilot project of the recommended practice version of ISDS with Seadrill (in Houston) in 2009. Several improvements were made to Seadrill's new build and operations practices as a result of this initiative, and a story on this has been published in Offshore Engineer.

DNV has been engaged with Dolphin Drilling in an effort that will lead to the issuance of the first ISDS class certificate, see article by Steve Marshall in Upstream Online.

DNV is engaged by the Daewoo Ship and Marine Engineering (DSME), Samsung Heavy Industries (SHI) and Hyundai Heavy Industries (HHI) yards in South Korea, for drilling units they are building for Songa Offshore, Fred Olsen Energy (Dolphin Drilling), Statoil and Diamond Drilling. The owners have specified a full scope for DNV follow-up on ISDS, including systems for emergency shutdown, fire and gas, BOP control, drilling control, pipe/riser handling, heave compensation and tensioning, bulk storage, drilling fluid circulation, cementing, dynamic positioning, power management and integrated automation.

In September 2013, DNV announced the contract with Diamond Drilling, the first American rig-owner to apply ISDS for a new-build project.

The ISDS methodology has been developed starting with best industry practices from aerospace, telecom and automotive industries, and adapting the requirements to fit the offshore and maritime domains. An article published in Oil & Gas Journal gives an industry perspective to ISDS.

In July 2015, the Songa Equinox, the first of Songa Offshore’s four new sixth generation Cat-D semisubmersible rigs, met the requirements of integrated software dependent systems (ISDS) standard (DNV-OS-D203) to prevent software glitches. The aim was to enable full tracking of the quality and version control of all integrated software systems, so that the yard and the user knows the status of all systems, the latest updates, if any still require close-out at the yard, at any given time. Noticeable improvements to the typical complex cyber dependent vessel newbuilding lifecycle were observed.
