= Yosef Yekutieli =

Israeli sportsman (1897–1982)

- יוסף יקותיאלי
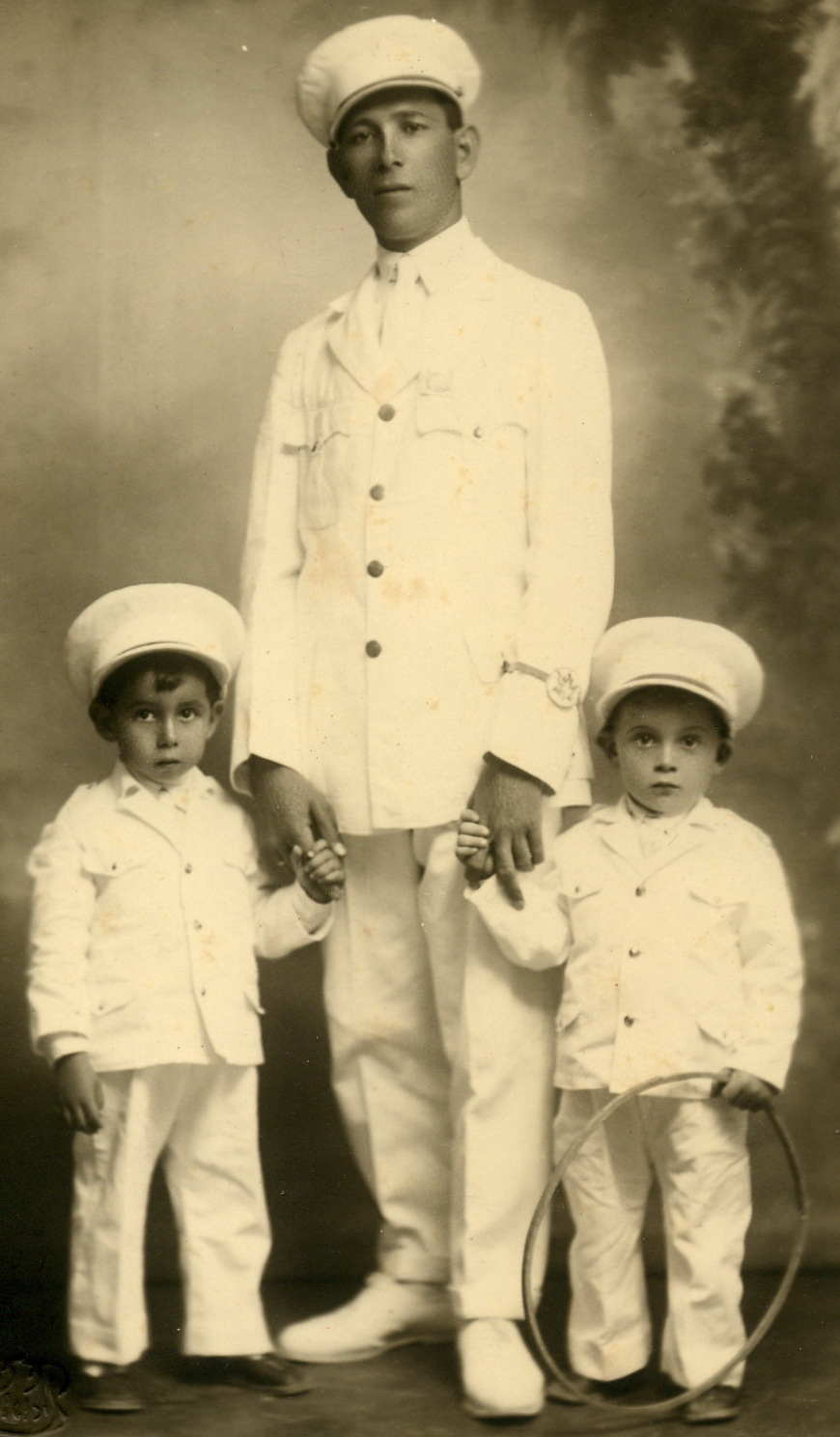
- Yosef Yekutieli, 1929
- Born: March 12, 1897; Kartuz-Bereza, Russian Empire
- Died: September 25, 1982 (aged 85); Tel Aviv, Israel
- Occupation: Sports promoter
- Years active: 1918–1966
- Known for: Founding the Maccabiah; Founding the Israel Football Association; Founding the Israel Olympic Committee; Promoting sports in Israel
- Relatives: Akiva Aryeh Weiss (father-in-law); Daniel Yekutieli (grandson)
- Awards: Israel Dov Hoz Prize (1954); Israel Prize (1979); Distinguished citizen of Tel Aviv (1981)

Yosef Yekutieli (also Joseph Yekutieli; Hebrew: יוסף יקותיאלי; April 12, 1897 – September 25, 1982) was a prominent member of the international Jewish sports organisation Maccabi. He was the founder of the Maccabiah, Israel Football Association, and the Israel Olympic Committee. Yekutieli was the 1979 Israel Prize recipient for his special contribution to society and the state in sports.

== Biography ==
Yosef Yekutieli was born in Kartuz-Bereza in the Russian Empire (now in western Belarus). In 1909, at the age of twelve, he immigrated to Ottoman Palestine with his family. He studied at the Tachkemoni Religious School in Tel Aviv and later at the David Yellin College of Education in Jerusalem. After completing his studies Yekutieli return to Jaffa working for the Eretz Yisrael Office, later playing football for the Maccabi Tel Aviv until the outbreak of World War I.

In 1914 Yekutieli was drafted to the Turkish army and was appointed physical education instructor at the Mujahideen headquarters and at the public school in Nablus. Yekutieli served as a Turkish-German interpreter at the German transport companies K.K. 502., until being exiled to Anatolia in 1918, along with all the other Jewish military members.

At the end of the war, Yekutieli returned to Jaffa working for the Eretz Yisrael Office at the Zionist Commission and Palestine Land Development Company. For two years, he worked for the Israel Electric Corporation acquiring land rights for high-voltage power lines from Naharayim to Tel Aviv.

Following his return to Palestine at the end of war, Yekutieli operated and ran the "Maccabi" until his death. He was the driving force behind the foundation of sport institutions in Israel, including the Eretz Israel Football Association in 1928, the Federation for Amateur Sports in Palestine (now the Israeli Athletic Association) in 1931 and the Olympic Committee of Eretz Israel in 1933.

=== Maccabiah ===
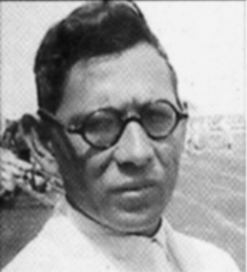
Yosef at the 1st Maccabiah

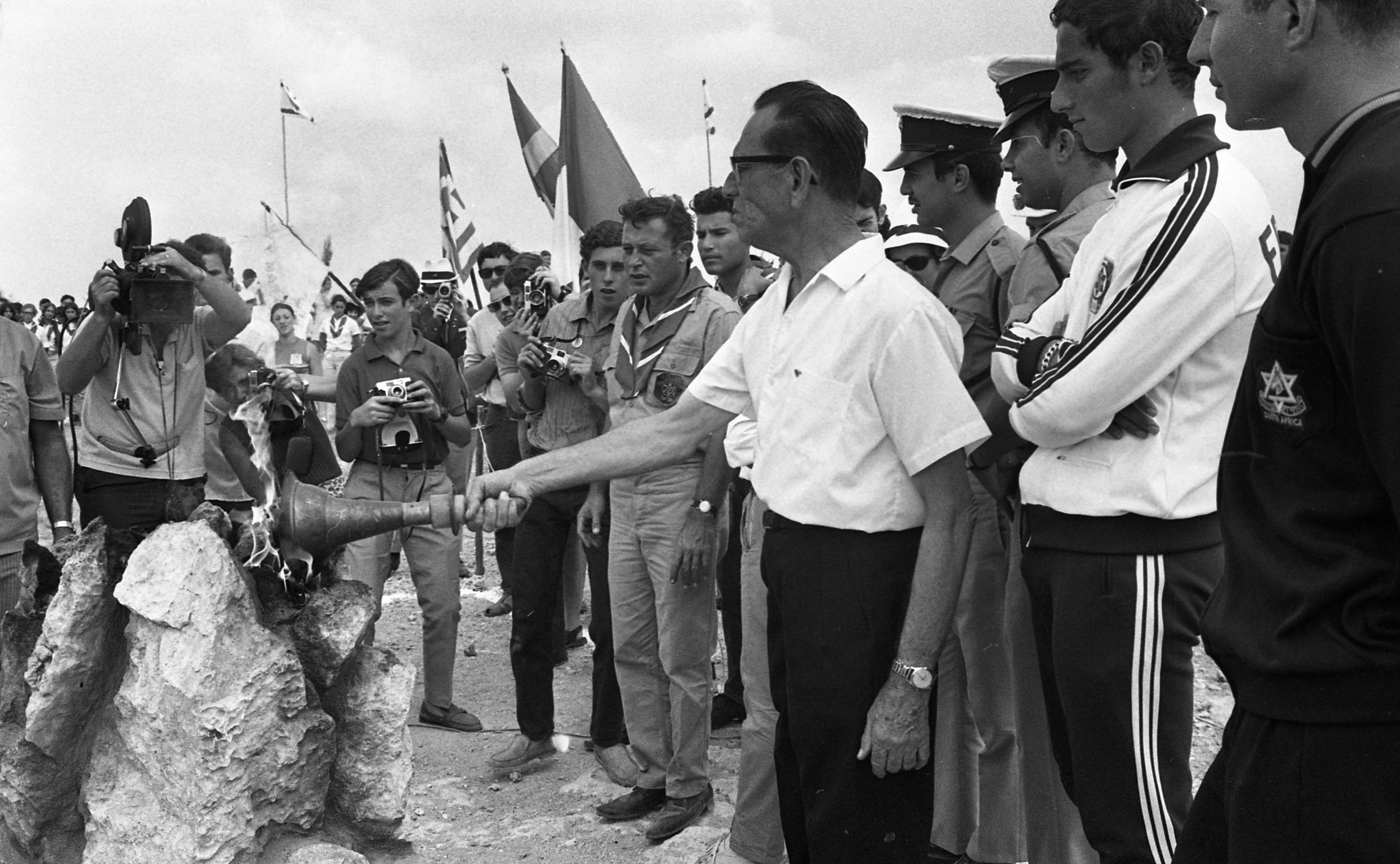
Yekutieli lighting the torch of the eighth Maccabia, 1969, from the collections of the National Library of Israel.

In June 1929, at the World Congress of Maccabi in Czechoslovakia, Yekutieli announced his proposal to organize the first Maccabiah, the "Maccabiada" (Hebrew: המכביאדה), in the spring of 1932, to be held in Mandatory Palestine. The road to fulfilling the vision was long and difficult. The 1932 Maccabiah Games were opened on March 28, 1932, and were held in the Maccabiah Stadium, which had been built especially for the games in the northern part of Tel Aviv. Around 400 athletes from 22 nations participated in the games, which became a recurring event every four years, except during World War II and the 1948 Arab–Israeli War.

The Maccabiah Flag, a donation by Yosef and Yehudit in memory of their son Amnon, a squad commander in the Palmach who was killed during the 1948 war at the foot of the Nabi Yusha fort, was first hoisted during the 3rd Maccabiah in Ramat Gan Stadium in 1950.

=== Later years ===
After the formation of Israel in 1948, Yekutieli was appointed as a senior official of the government's abandoned property committee. Yekutieli retired in 1966. In 1971, he released his first book, an autobiography.

Yosef married Yehudit, the daughter of Akiva Aryeh Weiss, the founder of Ahuzat Bayit, and they had four sons and two daughters. Their son, Gideon Yekutieli, was a professor of physics at the Weizmann Institute of Science, the first Israeli nuclear physicist. His grandson is Daniel Yekutieli, an Israeli statistician and professor at Tel Aviv University.

== Awards and recognition ==
In 1954, he was awarded the Israel Dov Hoz Prize and in 1979, he was awarded the Israel Prize for lifetime achievement in the design of sports and physical culture, promoting Israel and the establishment of international base of Israeli sports. In 1981, he was awarded distinguished citizen of Tel Aviv.

== Legacy ==
In June 2008, in a ceremony attended by Tel Aviv Mayor Ron Huldai, the Yosef Yekutieli street in North Port, near the first Maccabiah Stadium was named after him. In Modi'in-Maccabim-Re'ut, a road has been named after him. The Joseph Yekutieli Maccabi Archive at Kfar Maccabiah is also named after him.
