= Yosef Hochberg =

Israeli statistician (1945–2013)

- יוסף הוכברג
- Born: 1945
- Died: December 3, 2013 (aged 67–68)
- Education: University of North Carolina at Chapel Hill (PhD)
- Known for: False discovery rate Benjamini–Hochberg procedure Hochberg's step-up procedure
- Children: Gil Z. Hochberg
- Scientific career
- Fields: Statistics
- Workplaces: Tel Aviv University
- Thesis: Some approximate pairwise-efficient multiple-comparison procedures in general unbalanced designs (1974)
- Doctoral advisor: Pranab K. Sen

Yosef Hochberg (Hebrew: יוסף הוכברג; 1945 – December 3, 2013) was an Israeli statistician and professor of statistics at Tel Aviv University. He is best known for the development (with Yoav Benjamini) of the false discovery rate (FDR) criterion and the Benjamini–Hochberg (BH) procedure for controlling the FDR rate, as well as Hochberg's step-up procedure for controlling the family-wise error rate.

Hochberg earned his PhD at the University of North Carolina at Chapel Hill in 1974. Pranab K. Sen was his doctoral advisor.

While on leave from Tel Aviv University, he visited the Statistics and Operations Research Department at New York University.

He became a fellow of the American Statistical Association in 1994. He was the seventh president of the Israeli Statistical Association.

He died on December 3, 2013. His daughter is Israeli-American scholar Gil Z. Hochberg.

== Publications ==
=== Articles ===
- Benjamini, Yoav; Hochberg, Yosef (1995). "Controlling the False Discovery Rate: A Practical and Powerful Approach to Multiple Testing". Journal of the Royal Statistical Society. Series B (Methodological). 57 (1): 289–300. ISSN 0035-9246.
- Hochberg, Yosef (1 December 1988). "A sharper Bonferroni procedure for multiple tests of significance". Biometrika. 75 (4): 800–802. doi:10.1093/biomet/75.4.800. ISSN 0006-3444.

=== Books ===
- Multiple Comparison Procedures (1987)
