= Daniel Yekutieli =

Israeli statistician

- דניאל יקותיאלי
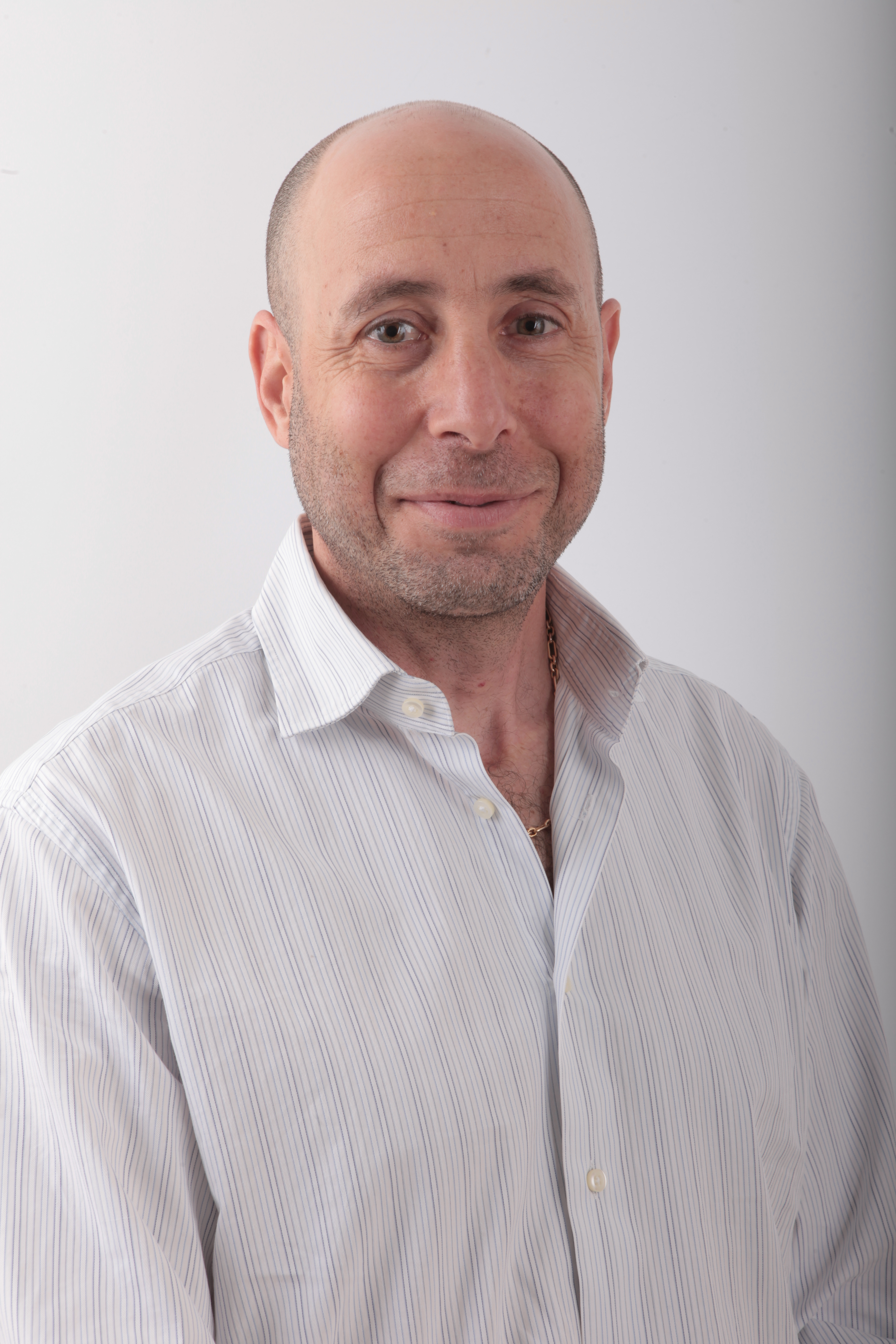
- Born: Rehovot, Israel
- Known for: False coverage rate Benjamini–Yekutieli procedure
- Relatives: Yosef Yekutieli (grandfather); Akiva Aryeh Weiss (great-grandfather)
- Awards: Rousseeuw Prize for Statistics (2024)

Academic background
- Education: Hebrew University of Jerusalem (BA); Tel Aviv University (MA, PhD)
- Thesis: Theoretical Results Needed for Applying the False Discovery Rate in Statistical Problems
- Doctoral advisor: Yoav Benjamini

Daniel Yekutieli is an Israeli statistician and professor at Tel Aviv University. He is one of the leading researchers in the field of applied statistics in Israel. He is known for the creation of the false coverage rate and for his work on the false discovery rate with Yoav Benjamini, including the Benjamini–Yekutieli (BY) procedure for controlling it.

== Biography ==
Yekutieli was born in Rehovot, Israel. His father, Gideon Yekutieli, was the first nuclear physicist in Israel and a professor at the Weizmann Institute of Science. His paternal grandfather was the founder of the Maccabiah Games, Yosef Yekutieli. His great-grandfather was Akiva Aryeh Weiss, one of the founders of Ahuzat Bayit (modern-day Tel Aviv).

Yekutieli received his BA in Mathematics from the Hebrew University of Jerusalem in 1992, and went on to earn his MA and PhD in Applied Statistics from Tel Aviv University. His PhD thesis, supervised by Yoav Benjamini and completed in 2002, first introduced the concept of the false coverage rate.

== Awards and honors ==
Together with Yoav Benjamini and Ruth Heller, he won the Rousseeuw Prize for Statistics in 2024 "for the pioneering work on the false discovery rate and methods to control it".

He was elected fellow of the Institute of Mathematical Statistics in 2020.
