= Babette Brumback =

American biostatistician

Babette Anne Brumback
- Education: University of Virginia; University of California, Berkeley (PhD)
- Known for: Marginal structural model
- Scientific career
- Fields: Statistics
- Workplaces: University of Washington; University of California, Los Angeles; University of Florida
- Thesis: Statistical Methods for Hormone Data (1996)
- Doctoral advisor: John A. Rice

Babette Anne Brumback is an American biostatistician known for her work on causal inference. She is a professor of biostatistics at the University of Florida.

== Education and career ==
Brumback earned a bachelor's degree in electrical engineering at the University of Virginia in 1988. She went to the University of California, Berkeley for graduate study, originally in electrical engineering and computer science but then switching to statistics; she earned a master's degree in 1992 and completed her Ph.D. in 1996. Her dissertation, Statistical Methods for Hormone Data, was supervised by John A. Rice.

After postdoctoral research at Harvard University she became an assistant professor of biostatistics at the University of Washington in 1999, and while there also became affiliated with the Fred Hutchinson Cancer Research Center. She moved to the University of California, Los Angeles in 2002 and again to the University of Florida in 2004.

== Honors and awards ==
Brumback chaired the Statistics in Epidemiology Section of the American Statistical Association for the 2015 term. She was president of the Florida Chapter of the American Statistical Association for 2015–2016.. Brumback was elected as a Fellow of the American Statistical Association in 2019.

== Bibliography ==
=== Books ===
- Brumback, Babette A. (2021). Fundamentals of Causal Inference: With R. Chapman and Hall/CRC. doi:10.1201/9781003146674. ISBN 9781003146674. S2CID 239122342.

=== Selected papers ===
- Brumback, Babette A.; Rice, John A. (1998). "Smoothing Spline Models for the Analysis of Nested and Crossed Samples of Curves". Journal of the American Statistical Association. 93 (443): 961–976. Bibcode:1998JASA...93..961B. doi:10.1080/01621459.1998.10473755. ISSN 0162-1459.
- Brumback, Babette A.; Ryan, Louise M.; Schwartz, Joel D.; Neas, Lucas M.; Stark, Paul C.; Burge, Harriet A. (2000). "Transitional Regression Models, with Application to Environmental Time Series". Journal of the American Statistical Association. 95 (449): 16–27. Bibcode:2000JASA...95...16B. doi:10.1080/01621459.2000.10473895. ISSN 0162-1459. S2CID 121862107.
- Robins, James M.; Hernán, Miguel Ángel; Brumback, Babette (2000). "Marginal Structural Models and Causal Inference in Epidemiology". Epidemiology. 11 (5): 550–560. doi:10.1097/00001648-200009000-00011. ISSN 1044-3983. JSTOR 3703997. PMID 10955408. S2CID 8907527.
- Hernán, Miguel Ángel; Brumback, Babette; Robins, James M. (2000). "Marginal Structural Models to Estimate the Causal Effect of Zidovudine on the Survival of HIV-Positive Men". Epidemiology. 11 (5): 561–570. doi:10.1097/00001648-200009000-00012. ISSN 1044-3983. JSTOR 3703998. PMID 10955409.
- Greenland, Sander; Brumback, Babette (2002). "An overview of relations among causal modelling methods". International Journal of Epidemiology. 31 (5): 1030–1037. doi:10.1093/ije/31.5.1030. ISSN 1464-3685. PMID 12435780.
