= Yoav Benjamini =

Israeli statistician (born 1949)

- יואב בנימיני
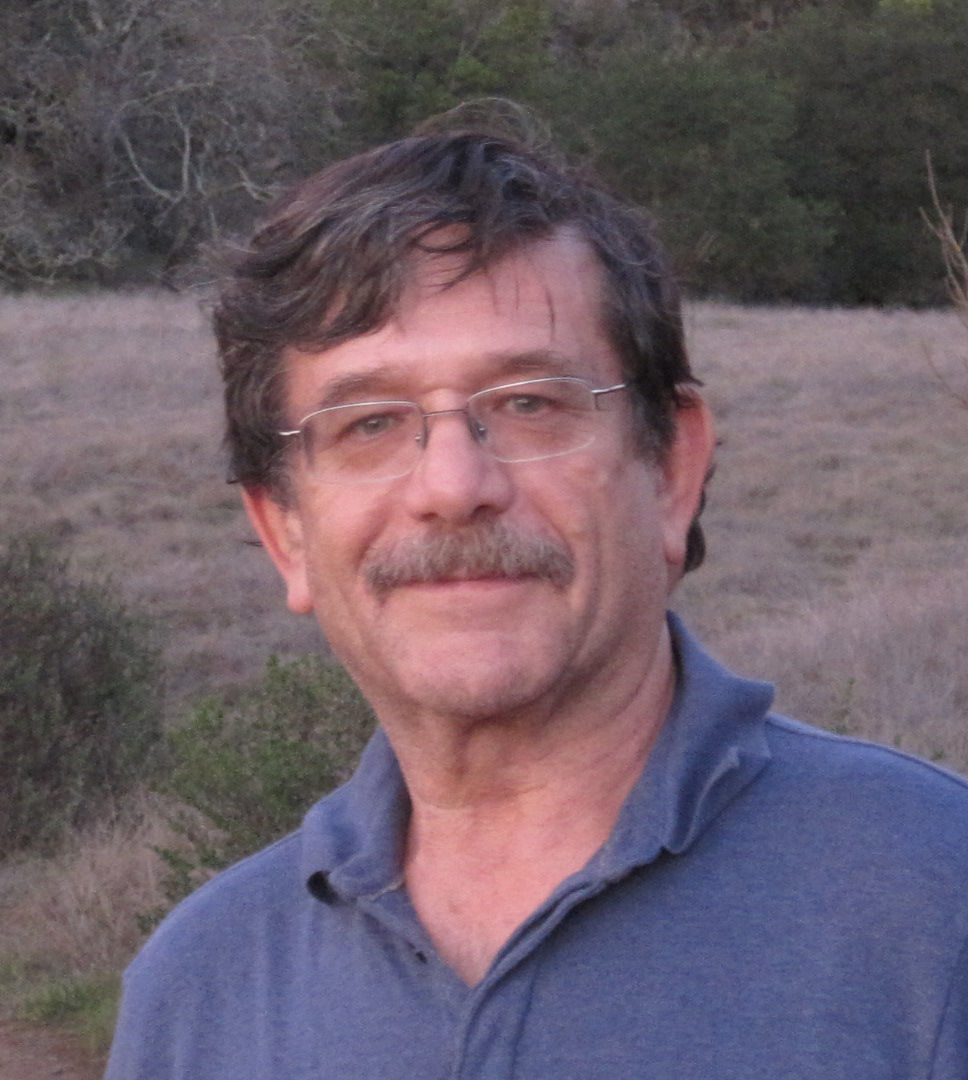
- Yoav Benjamini
- Born: 5 January 1949 (age 77); Israel
- Education: Hebrew University of Jerusalem; Princeton University
- Known for: False discovery rate Benjamini–Hochberg procedure Benjamini–Yekutieli procedure
- Awards: Israel Prize (2012); Rousseeuw Prize for Statistics (2024)
- Scientific career
- Fields: Statistics
- Workplaces: Tel Aviv University
- Thesis: Is the t-test conservative when the parent distribution is long tailed? (1981)
- Doctoral advisor: Peter Bloomfield
- Doctoral students: Daniel Yekutieli; Ruth Heller

Yoav Benjamini (Hebrew: יואב בנימיני; born 5 January 1949) is an Israeli statistician best known for the development (with Yosef Hochberg) of the false discovery rate (FDR) criterion and the Benjamini–Hochberg (BH) and Benjamini–Yekutieli (BY) procedures for controlling the FDR. He is currently The Nathan and Lily Silver Professor of Applied Statistics at Tel Aviv University.

He won the Israel Prize in 2012 and the Rousseeuw Prize for Statistics in 2024.

== Early life ==
Yoav graduated high school from the Hebrew Reali School in Haifa in 1966 and later studied mathematics and physics at the Hebrew University of Jerusalem graduating in 1973. His master's degree in mathematics is from the same university in 1976. In 1981, he received his PhD in statistics from Princeton University in the United States.

== Career ==
In 1981, he joined the faculty of the Department of Statistics and Operations Research at Tel Aviv University, and in 2000, he was promoted to full professor. From 2003 to 2006, he served as head of the department, from 2006 to 2011, as head of the Statistical Consulting Laboratory, and from 2009, as head of the Chair of Applied Statistics. From 2001 to 2003, he served as vice president of the Israeli Statistical Association, and from 2007 to 2009, he served as president of the association. In 2011, he was on sabbatical at the University of California, Berkeley, and Stanford University.

== Scientific fields of interest ==
Benjamini's scientific work combines theoretical research in statistical methodology with applied research that involves complex problems with massive data. The methodological work is on selective and simultaneous inference (multiple comparisons), as well as on general methods for data analysis, data mining, and data visualization. His research citations from Google Scholar exceed 100,000.

== Personal life ==
He is the father of three children, and the grandfather of nine grandchildren. His son, Yuval Benjamini, is a professor of statistics and data science at the Hebrew University of Jerusalem.

== Honors and awards ==
- 2012: Israel Prize recipient in statistics
- 2020: elected to the National Academy of Sciences (NAS), US
- 2024: Rousseeuw Prize for Statistics recipient in statistics, with his past students in Tel Aviv University Ruth Heller and Daniel Yekutieli, "for the pioneering work on the false discovery rate"

== Publications ==
- 1983: "Is the T-test really conservative when the parent distribution is long-tailed", Journal of the American Statistical Association
- 1986: "Observational rainfall – runoff analysis for estimating effects of cloud seeding on water resources in Northern Israel", Journal of Hydrology (with Y. Harpaz)
- 1988: "Opening the box of a boxplot", The American Statistician
- 1990: "More powerful procedures for multiple significance testing", Statistics in Medicine (with Y. Hochberg)
- 1995: "Controlling the False Discovery Rate: a practical and powerful approach to multiple testing", Journal of the Royal Statistical Society, Series B (with Y. Hochberg)
- 1998: "Confidence intervals with more power to determine the sign: two ends constrain the means", Journal of the American Statistical Association (with Y. Hochberg & PB. Stark)
- 2000: "The adaptive control of the false discovery rate in multiple comparison problems", The Journal of Educational and Behavioral Statistics (with Y. Hochberg)
- 2001: The control of the False Discovery Rate in multiple testing under dependency, Annals of Statistics (with D. Yekutieli)
- 2002: John Tukey’s contributions to multiple comparisons, Annals of Statistics, (with H. Braun)
- 2003: Identifying Differentially Expressed Genes Using False Discovery Rate Controlling Procedures, Bioinformatics (with A. Reiner & D. Yekutieli)
- 2005: Genotype-environment interactions in mouse behavior: A way out of the problem, Proceedings of the National Academy of Sciences (with N. Kafkafi, A. Sakov & others)
- 2005: False discovery rate controlling confidence intervals for selected parameters, Journal of the American Statistical Association (with Y. Yekutieli
- 2006: Adapting to unknown sparsity by controlling the false discovery rate, Annals of Statistics (with: F. Abramovich, D. Donoho & IM. Johnstone)
- 2006: Adaptive linear step-up procedures that control the false discovery rate, Biometrika (with A.M. Krieger & D. Yekutieli)
- 2008: Screening for partial conjunction hypotheses. Biometrics (with R. Heller)
- 2011: Quantifying the buildup in extent and complexity of behavior – the case of free exploration in mice, Proceedings of the National Academy of Sciences (with E. Fonio, T. Galili and others)
