= Akiva Aryeh Weiss =

Zionist activist and architect (1868–1947)

- עקיבא אריה ויס
- Born: December 11, 1868; Grodno, Grodno Governorate, Russian Empire (present-day Belarus)
- Died: May 23, 1947 (aged 78); Mandatory Palestine
- Known for: Founder of Ahuzat Bayit
- Relatives: Yosef Yekutieli (son-in-law); Daniel Yekutieli (great-grandson)

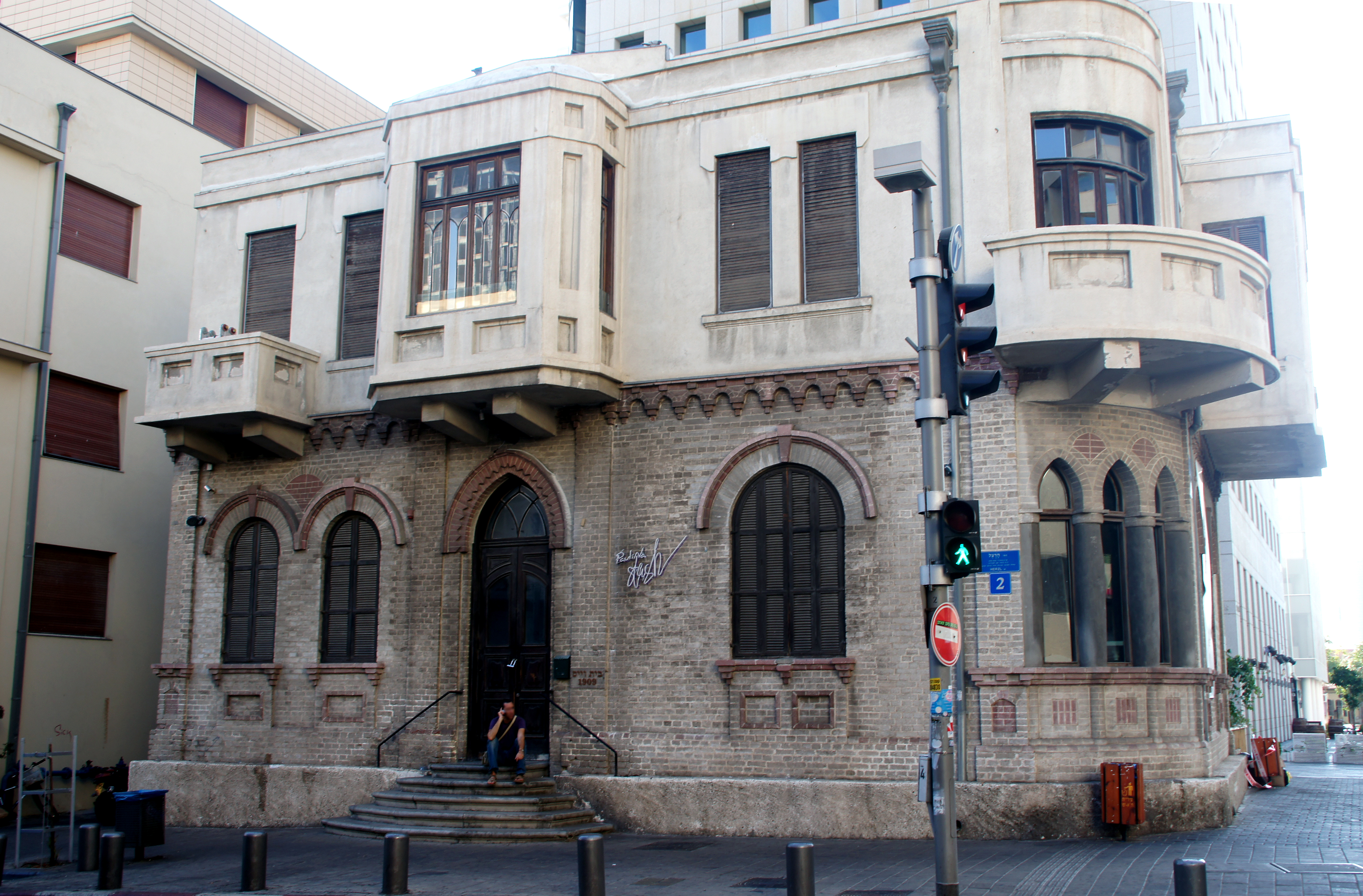
Akiva Arie Weiss House, ground floor built 1909

Akiva Arieh Weiss, also spelled Aryeh (December 11, 1868 – May 23, 1947), was a Zionist activist, architect, and city planner in Palestine. He is best known as the primary founder of Tel Aviv. He had been the initiator of the project to create the "first Hebrew city" in Palestine and presided over its establishment. He also helped establish the Jewish diamond industry and textile industry in Palestine.

== Biography ==
Weiss, a jeweler and watchmaker, was born to a Jewish family in Grodna (in present day Belarus) in 1868, but raised in Łódz, Poland. Along with his wife and six children, he immigrated from Russian Poland to Palestine in 1906.

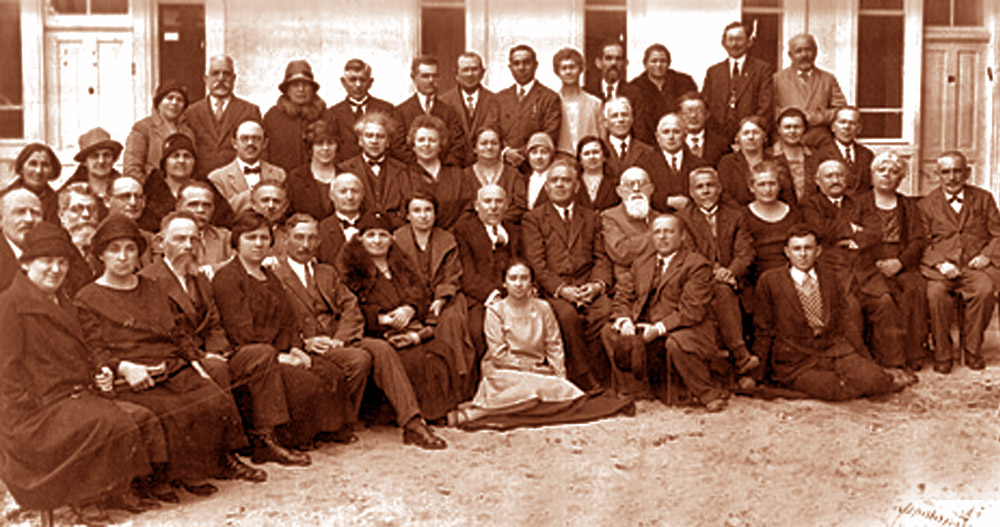
Ahuzat Bayit, 1929. Weiss is at center.

As president of the then newly established building cooperative named Ahuzat Bayit, Hebrew for Building Society, Weiss wrote and presented a prospectus to the group in which he laid out his vision for a new Jewish city. Arthur Ruppin's memoirs recount that Weiss demanded the creation of "a Hebrew urban centre in a healthy environment, planned according to the rules of aesthetics and modern hygiene." Weiss would later on tell Ruppin; “Outside Jaffa, on the road to Petach Tikva...we intend to found a modern Jewish urban district. We already have our eye on a particular tract of land.”

Currently scholarship also suggests that he likely presided over the 1909 real estate lottery (and is the leading figure in Abraham Soskin's famous photograph of the event) in which 66 Jewish families drew numbers written on seashells to determine the allocation of lots in the about-to-be established city of Tel Aviv.

Weiss was a founder of the textile industry in Mandatory Palestine, and built the earliest textile factory, the Lodzia House.

One of Weiss' visions which became reality was the establishment of a Jewish diamond industry in Palestine.

== Legacy ==
In 1956, Weiss’s children put together a posthumous collection of his works, essays and letters. The book featured an introduction by Moshe Sharett, the 2nd Prime Minister of Israel and a man of considerable stature at the time. Sharett's introduction read thus (translated from Hebrew):

"It is not always those who start things that are remembered. Sometimes they are forgotten, and those who continue and finish the work are those who ultimately win praise. This is what happened with Tel Aviv. The "first founder" was forgotten. There are no pictures of him in the mayor's office and no streets named after him….The people who have put together this book have done a good thing by making this book. Let this collection serve as a memorial to this modest and noble man who was full of ideas and actions, and whose ideas have and will came to life."

== House ==
The cornerstone of Weiss's Tel Aviv house at #2 Herzl Street was laid in 1909. Originally a single-story structure, the upper floor was added in the 1920s. The house was restored between 1996 and 2011.

== See also ==
- Media related to Akiva Arie Weiss at Wikimedia Commons
