= International Society for Disease Surveillance =

Non-profit organisation for disease surveillance

- Formation: 2001
- Membership: 400
- Location: Boston, Massachusetts
- Website: www.syndromic.org

The International Society for Disease Surveillance (ISDS) is a 501(c)(3) nonprofit organization, based in Boston, Massachusetts, dedicated to the improvement of public health by advancing the science and practice of disease surveillance. ISDS facilitates interdisciplinary collaboration, promotes and conducts research, education, and advocacy. ISDS's 400+ membership represents professional and academic subject matter experts in the fields of public health surveillance, clinical practice, health informatics, health policy, and other areas related to national and global health surveillance. ISDS holds an annual national conference for the public health surveillance community. The ISDS is a member society of the Global Health Workforce Alliance founded in 2006.

== History ==
The International Society for Disease Surveillance (ISDS) grew out of interest in real-time detection, using non-traditional surveillance methods for the earlier detection of disease outbreaks than traditional disease detection systems prior to the Anthrax attacks in 2001. It was founded in 2005.

Distribute was a project of the ISDS until 2012. Data mostly on influenza-like illnesses was collected from state and local public health organizations usually on a daily basis. This system allowed comparisons to be made between different states and cities. CDC funding for Distribute was discontinued in May 2012, and the site was taken offline.

== Activities ==
Ongoing ISDS activities include:

- Building and sustaining a surveillance Community of Practice (CoP).
- Fostering innovations in surveillance research and practice.
- Increasing public health capacity by providing support and technical expertise to local, regional, and federal public health practitioners in the United States and around the world.
- Developing targeted resources to inform and expand the dialogue on timely topics of interest to the surveillance community.
- Hosting surveillance education and training activities that build workforce competencies.
- Convening the ISDS annual conference and disseminating findings by publishing abstracts in print and online proceedings.

== Board of directors ==
ISDS is governed by a twelve-person Board of Directors representing national and international leaders in disease surveillance. The board of directors was expanded to add the Board's first two international members in December 2013.

This Board is responsible for governance of the society and adherence to the ISDS mission and values. While upholding these responsibilities, the Board provides strategic and fiscal oversight of ISDS activities. Board members take leadership roles within specific committees or areas while ensuring all programming furthers the goal of advancing public health surveillance. Members of the Board of Directors are elected for three year terms, at the end of which they may be reelected.

== Membership ==
ISDS represents professionals from all aspects of the surveillance community. ISDS membership is open to epidemiologists, informaticists, public health practitioners, health care providers, statisticians, and others who are interested in exploring and addressing population health monitoring across institutional and professional boundaries.

== Conference ==
The ISDS Conference is an event dedicated to the advancement of the science and practice of biosurveillance. Every year, the ISDS Conference draws over 350 professionals from a broad range of disciplines to learn the latest achievements, analytic methods, best practices, conceptual frameworks, and technical innovations in the rapidly evolving field of disease surveillance.

The ISDS Conferences provide fertile ground for cultivating new ideas and partnerships by bringing together local, state, and federal public health practitioners, academic researchers, clinicians, policymakers, and decision makers from governmental and nongovernmental entities.

The 12th Annual Conference was held in December 2013, in New Orleans, Louisiana. The theme for the 2013 Conference—Translating Research and Surveillance into Action—highlighted one of the salient topics voiced by the biosurveillance community, and focused on strategies for incorporating the latest in biosurveillance approaches, methodologies, and results into data-driven public health practices, programs, and policies. The 13th Annual Conference was held in December at Philadelphia, Pennsylvania.
