= Statisticians' and engineers' cross-reference of statistical terms =

Terms used by electrical engineers in statistical signal processing studies

The following terms are used by electrical engineers in statistical signal processing studies instead of typical statistician's terms.

Statistics	Electrical engineering
Null hypothesis	Noise only hypothesis
Alternative hypothesis	Signal + noise hypothesis
Critical region	Signal present decision region
Type I error	False alarm (FA) (noted as $P_{FA}$)
Type II error	Miss

In other engineering fields, particularly mechanical engineering, uncertainty analysis examines systematic and random components of variations in measurements associated with physical experiments.
