= Sadulla Karjiker =

South African legal scholar

- Born: 6 January 1970; Cape Town, South Africa
- Education: BSc LLB (University of Cape Town), LLM (London), LLD (Stellenbosch University)
- Scientific career
- Fields: Intellectual Property Law
- Institutions: Stellenbosch University

Sadulla Karjiker (born 6 January 1970) is a South African legal scholar and Professor & Anton Mostert Chair in Intellectual Property Law at Stellenbosch University. He is known for his works on corporate law and intellectual property.

== Views ==
In June 2020, in an article on Daily Maverick, Karjiker criticized the proponents of the Copyright Amendment Bill (South African copyright law) for resorting to "placing the blind and visually impaired at the centre of their attempts to pressure the president to sign the bill." The article was replied by Blind SA.
