= Science of morality =

Forms of ethical naturalism

Science of morality (also known as scientific morality or science of ethics or scientific ethics) may refer to various forms of ethical naturalism grounding morality and ethics in rational, empirical or scientific consideration of the natural world. It is sometimes framed as using the scientific approach to determine what is right and wrong, in contrast to the widespread belief that "science has nothing to say on the subject of human values".

== Overview ==
Moral science may refer to the consideration of what is best for, and how to maximize the flourishing of, either particular individuals or all conscious creatures. It has been proposed that "morality" can be appropriately defined on the basis of fundamental premises necessary for any empirical, secular, or philosophical discussion and that societies can use the methods of science to provide answers to moral questions.

The norms advocated by moral scientists (e.g. rights to abortion, euthanasia, and drug liberalization under certain circumstances) would be founded upon the shifting and growing collection of human understanding. Even with science's admitted degree of ignorance, and the various semantic issues, moral scientists can meaningfully discuss things as being almost certainly "better" or "worse" for promoting flourishing.

== History ==
=== In philosophy ===
Utilitarian Jeremy Bentham discussed some of the ways moral investigations are a science. He criticized deontological ethics for failing to recognize that it needed to make the same presumptions as his science of morality to really work – whilst pursuing rules that were to be obeyed in every situation (something that worried Bentham).

W. V. O. Quine advocated naturalizing epistemology by looking to natural sciences like psychology for a full explanation of knowledge. His work contributed to a resurgence of moral naturalism in the last half of the 20th century. Paul Kurtz, who believes that the careful, secular pursuit of normative rules is vital to society, coined the term eupraxophy to refer to his approach to normative ethics. Steven Pinker, Sam Harris, and Peter Singer believe that we learn what is right and wrong through reason and empirical methodology.

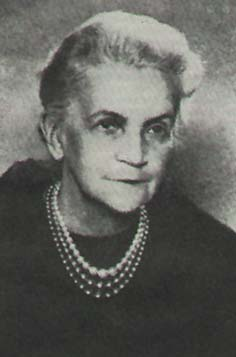
Maria Ossowska used the methods of science to understand the origins of moral norms.

Maria Ossowska thought that sociology was inextricably related to philosophical reflections on morality, including normative ethics. She proposed that science analyse: (a) existing social norms and their history, (b) the psychology of morality, and the way that individuals interact with moral matters and prescriptions, and (c) the sociology of morality.

=== In popular literature ===
The theory and methods of a normative science of morality are explicitly discussed in Joseph Daleiden's The Science of Morality: The Individual, Community, and Future Generations (1998). Daleiden's book, in contrast to Harris, extensively discusses the relevant philosophical literature. In The Moral Landscape: How Science Can Determine Human Values, Sam Harris's goal is to show how moral truth can be backed by "science", or more specifically, empirical knowledge, critical thinking, philosophy, but most controversially, the scientific method.

Patricia Churchland offers that, accepting David Hume's is–ought problem, the use of induction from premises and definitions remains a valid way of reasoning in life and science:

Our moral behavior, while more complex than the social behavior of other animals, is similar in that it represents our attempt to manage well in the existing social ecology. ... from the perspective of neuroscience and brain evolution, the routine rejection of scientific approaches to moral behavior based on Hume's warning against deriving ought from is seems unfortunate, especially as the warning is limited to deductive inferences. ... The truth seems to be that values rooted in the circuitry for caring—for well-being of self, offspring, mates, kin, and others—shape social reasoning about many issues: conflict resolutions, keeping the peace, defense, trade, resource distribution, and many other aspects of social life in all its vast richness.

Daleiden and Leonard Carmichael warn that science is probabilistic, and that certainty is not possible. One should therefore expect that moral prescriptions will change as humans gain understanding. (Note: To quote Carmichael: "We do not turn aside from what we know about astronomy at any time because there is still a great deal we do not know, or because so much of what we once thought we knew is no longer recognized as true. May not the same argument be accepted in our thinking about ethical and esthetic judgements?")

=== In futurism ===
Transhumanist philosophers such as David Pearce and Mark Alan Walker have extensively discussed the ethical implications of future technologies. Walker coined the term "biohappiness" to describe the idea of directly manipulating the biological roots of happiness in order to increase it. Pearce argues that suffering could eventually be eradicated entirely, stating that: "It is predicted that the world's last unpleasant experience will be a precisely dateable event." Proposed technological methods of overcoming the hedonic treadmill include wireheading (direct brain stimulation for uniform bliss), which undermines motivation and evolutionary fitness; designer drugs, offering sustainable well-being without side effects, though impractical for lifelong reliance; and genetic engineering, the most promising approach. Genetic recalibration through hyperthymia-promoting genes could raise hedonic set-points, fostering adaptive well-being, creativity, and productivity while maintaining responsiveness to stimuli. While scientifically achievable, this transformation requires careful ethical and societal considerations to navigate its profound implications.

On the opposite end of the spectrum, risks of astronomical suffering are possible futures in which vastly more suffering will exist than has ever been produced on earth so far in all of earth's history. Possible sources of these risks include artificial superintelligence, genetic engineering for maximum suffering, space colonization, and terraforming leading to an increase in wild animal suffering.

== Views in scientific morality ==
=== Training to promote good behaviour ===
The science of morality may aim to discover the best ways to motivate and shape individuals. Methods to accomplish this include instilling explicit virtues, building character strengths, and forming mental associations. These generally require some level of practical reason. James Rest suggested that abstract reasoning is also a factor in making moral judgements and emphasized that moral judgements alone do not predict moral behaviour: “Moral judgement may be closely related to advocacy behaviour, which in turn influences social institutions, which in turn creates a system of norms and sanctions that influences people’s behaviour.” Daleiden suggested that religions instill a practical sense of virtue and justice, right and wrong. They also effectively use art and myths to educate people about moral situations.

==== Role of government ====
Harris argues that moral science does not imply an "Orwellian future" with "scientists at every door". Instead, Harris imagines data about normative moral issues being shared in the same way as other sciences (e.g. peer-reviewed journals on medicine).

Daleiden specifies that government, like any organization, should have limited power. He says "centralization of power irrevocably in the hands of one person or an elite has always ultimately led to great evil for the human race. It was the novel experiment of democracy—a clear break with tradition—that ended the long tradition of tyranny.” He is also explicit that government should only use law to enforce the most basic, reasonable, proven and widely supported moral norms. In other words, there are a great many moral norms that should never be the task of the government to enforce.

==== Role of punishment ====
One author has argued that to attain a society where people are motivated by conditioned self-interest, punishment must go hand-in-hand with reward. For instance, in this line of reasoning, prison remains necessary for many perpetrators of crimes. This is so, even if libertarian free will is false. This is because punishment can still serve its purposes: it deters others from committing their own crimes, educates and reminds everyone about what the society stands for, incapacitates the criminal from doing more harm, goes some way to relieving or repaying the victim, and corrects the criminal (also see recidivism). This author argues that, at least, any prison system should be pursuing those goals, and that it is an empirical question as to what sorts of punishment realize these goals most effectively, and how well various prison systems actually serve these purposes.

=== Research ===
The brain areas that are consistently involved when humans reason about moral issues have been investigated. The neural network underlying moral decisions overlaps with the network pertaining to representing others' intentions (i.e., theory of mind) and the network pertaining to representing others' (vicariously experienced) emotional states (i.e., empathy). This supports the notion that moral reasoning is related to both seeing things from other persons’ points of view and to grasping others’ feelings. These results provide evidence that the neural network underlying moral decisions is probably domain-global (i.e., there might be no such things as a "moral module" in the human brain) and might be dissociable into cognitive and affective sub-systems.

An essential, shared component of moral judgment involves the capacity to detect morally salient content within a given social context. Recent research implicated the salience network in this initial detection of moral content. The salience network responds to behaviourally salient events, and may be critical to modulate downstream default and frontal control network interactions in the service of complex moral reasoning and decision-making processes. This suggest that moral cognition involves both bottom-up and top-down attentional processes, mediated by discrete large-scale brain networks and their interactions.

=== In universities ===
Moral sciences is offered at the degree level at Ghent University (as "an integrated empirical and philosophical study of values, norms and world views").

=== Other implications ===
Daleiden provides examples of how science can use empirical evidence to assess the effect that specific behaviours can have on the well-being of individuals and society with regard to various moral issues. He argues that science supports decriminalization and regulation of drugs, euthanasia under some circumstances, and the permission of sexual behaviours that are not tolerated in some cultures (he cites homosexuality as an example). Daleiden further argues that in seeking to reduce human suffering, abortion should not only be permissible, but at times a moral obligation (as in the case of a mother of a potential child who would face the probability of much suffering). Like all moral claims in his book, however, Daleiden is adamant that these decisions remain grounded in, and contingent on empirical evidence. (Note: Joseph Daleiden's final word regarding his book, The Science of Morality, is that “[The study of ethics] should be included with the social sciences and be subject to as rigorous a scientific program of research as any other area of human behaviour. Lacking this scientific rigour, the moral conclusions drawn in this volume must be considered as working hypotheses, some with greater degree of evidentiary support than others. It is the process by which to assess and transmit moral norms that was the primary focus of this work, and I hope it will serve as a new way of deciding moral issues.”)

The ideas of cultural relativity, to Daleiden, do offer some lessons: investigators must be careful not to judge a person's behaviour without understanding the environmental context. An action may be necessary and more moral once we are aware of circumstances. However, Daleiden emphasizes that this does not mean all ethical norms or systems are equally effective at promoting flourishing and he often offers the equal treatment of women as a reliably superior norm, wherever it is practiced.

== Criticisms ==
The idea of a normative science of morality has met with many criticisms from scientists and philosophers. Critics include physicist Sean M. Carroll, who argues that morality cannot be part of science. He and other critics cite the widely held "fact-value distinction", that the scientific method cannot answer "moral" questions, although it can describe the norms of different cultures. In contrast, moral scientists defend the position that such a division between values and scientific facts ("moral relativism") is not only arbitrary and illusory, but impeding progress towards taking action against documented cases of human rights violations in different cultures.

Stephen Jay Gould argued that science and religion occupy "non-overlapping magisteria". To Gould, science is concerned with questions of fact and theory, but not with meaning and morality – the magisteria of religion. In the same vein, Edward Teller proposed that politics decides what is right, whereas science decides what is true.

During a discussion on the role that naturalism might play in professions like nursing, the philosopher Trevor Hussey calls the popular view that science is unconcerned with morality "too simplistic". Although his main focus in the paper is naturalism in nursing, he goes on to explain that science can, at very least, be interested in morality at a descriptive level. He even briefly entertains the idea that morality could itself be a scientific subject, writing that one might argue "... that moral judgements are subject to the same kinds of rational, empirical examination as the rest of the world: they are a subject for science – although a difficult one. If this could be shown to be so, morality would be contained within naturalism. However, I will not assume the truth of moral realism here." (Note: Hussey writes "The relationship between naturalism and morality and politics is complicated, and is difficult to state in a few sentences because it involves deep philosophical issues. Only the briefest discussion is possible here. The most popular view is that science, and hence naturalism, is concerned with objective facts and not with values: with what is the case rather than what ought to be. But this is too simplistic." He gives a reason immediately: "First, at the very least, science can study morality and politics at a descriptive level and try to understand their workings within societies and in the lives of individuals, and investigate their evolutionary origins, their social propagation, and so on." Hussey then describes how scientists must adhere to certain values, but also how values guide what it is that science may investigate. His real interest in the paper is to justify naturalism as a nursing practice, yet he does eventually write: "Finally, the idea that science and morality are separate realms, one dealing with facts the other with values, is not as certain and clear-cut as it seems. Various versions of moral realism are now widely discussed among philosophers (e.g. Railton, 1986, 1996, 2003; Sayre-McCord, 1988; Dancy, 1993; Casebeer, 2003; Shafer-Landau, 2003; Baghramian, 2004; Smith, 1994, 2004). Despite their differences, moral realists generally agree on two principles. First, that our moral utterances, such as ‘Murder is morally wrong’ or ‘We ought to be honest’ are genuine statements and hence they are capable of being either true or false. Second, what makes them either true or false are aspects of the real world, open to objective examination. It can be argued that it is an implication of this thesis that moral judgements are subject to the same kinds of rational, empirical examination as the rest of the world: they are a subject for science – although a difficult one." He continues "If this could be shown to be so, morality would be contained within naturalism. However, I will not assume the truth of moral realism here. It is sufficient to say that it has at least as much credibility as any theory claiming a supernatural or divine foundation for morality: views which, while popular among the general public, do not have widespread support among moral philosophers – for what that is worth." Hussey thus directs discussion back towards Naturalism in nursing because his main point in all this was, in the end, to prove that naturalistic moralities are not necessarily less credible than supernatural ones, and may even be more credible.)

== See also ==
- Ethical calculus
- Ethical theory
- Ethical naturalism
- Evolution of morality
- Evolutionary ethics
- Golden Rule
- Felicific calculus
- Kohlberg's stages of moral development
- Meta-ethics
- Moral conviction
- Moral psychology
- Moral relativism
- Moral scepticism
- Pareto efficiency
- The Moral Arc, a book by Michael Shermer
- Scientism
- Secular ethics
- Secular morality
- Social Darwinism
- Value (personal and cultural)
- Welfare economics
