= Ethics in mathematics =

Emerging field of applied ethics

Ethics in mathematics is an emerging field of applied ethics, the inquiry into ethical aspects of the practice and applications of mathematics. It deals with the professional responsibilities of mathematicians whose work influences decisions with major consequences, such as in law, finance, the military, and environmental science. When understood in its socio-economic context, the development of mathematical works can lead to ethical questions ranging from the handling and manipulation of big data to questions of responsible mathematisation and falsification of models, explainable and safe mathematics, as well as many issues related to communication and documentation. The usefulness of a Hippocratic oath for mathematicians is an issue of ongoing debate among scholars. As an emerging field of applied ethics, many of its foundations are still highly debated. The discourse remains in flux. Especially the notion that mathematics can do harm remains controversial.

The ethical questions surrounding the practice of mathematics can be connected to issues of dual-use. An instrumental interpretation of the impact of mathematics makes it difficult to see ethical consequences, yet it might be easier to see how all branches of mathematics serve to structure and conceptualize solutions to real problems. These structures can set up perverse incentives, where targets can be met without improving services, or league table positions are gamed. While the assumptions written into metrics often reflect the worldview of the groups who are responsible for designing them, they are harder for non-experts to challenge, leading to injustices. As mathematicians can enter the workforce of industrialised nations in many places that are no longer limited to teaching and academia, scholars have made the argument that it is necessary to add ethical training into the mathematical curricula at universities.

The philosophical positions on the relationship between mathematics and ethics are varied. Some philosophers (e.g. Plato) see both mathematics and ethics as rational and similar, while others (e.g. Rudolf Carnap) see ethics as irrational and different from mathematics. Possible tensions between applying mathematics in a social context and its ethics can already be observed in Plato's Republic (Book VIII) where the use of mathematics to produce better guardians plays a critical role in its collapse.

== Need for ethics in the mathematics profession ==
Mathematicians in industrial, scientific, military and intelligence roles crucially influence decisions with significant consequences.

=== Issues of accuracy ===
For example, complex calculations were needed for the success of the Manhattan Project, while the overextended use of the Gaussian copula formula to price derivatives before the 2008 financial crisis has been called "the formula that killed Wall Street", and the theory of global warming depends on the reliability of mathematical models of climate.

=== Issues of impact ===
For the same reason as in medical ethics and engineering ethics, the high impact of the consequences of decisions imposes serious ethical obligations on practitioners to consider the rights and wrongs of their advice and decisions. The potential impact of data and new technology is leading more professions, such as accountancy, to consider how bias is overseen in automated systems, from algorithms to AI. Due to its large impact and its necessity in the modern industrialised world, mathematics has been labelled as a new factor of production by some scholars. Mathematics is a fundamental driver of today's economies and plays an everyday role in the decision making in capitalist markets. When studied in its socio-economic context, the debates surrounding the ethical use of mathematics often go under different names, e.g. some people speak of the ethics of quantification. These discourses are often disjoint from those directly affecting or driven by parts of the mathematical community.

== Disasters involving the use of mathematics ==
These illustrate the major consequences of numerical mistakes and hence the need for ethical care.

- The Club of Rome's 1972 mathematical-model-based predictions in The Limits to Growth of widespread collapse of the world system by the end of the 21st century.
- The wrongful conviction of Sally Clark (1999), An English solicitor, Sally Clark, was wrongfully convicted of murdering her two children – each of whom had died due to sudden infant death syndrome – due to a fundamental statistical error in the testimony of an "expert". The error was further compounded by the "prosecutor's fallacy".

== Ethical issues in the mathematical profession ==
Mathematicians have a professional responsibility to support the ethical use of mathematics in practice, both to sustain the reputation of the profession and to protect society from the impacts of unethical behavior. For example, mathematics is extensively applied in the use of Big Data in Artificial Intelligence applications, both by mathematicians and non-mathematicians, with complex impacts that are not readily understood or anticipated.

== Ethics in data journalism ==
Journalism has established Professional ethics which is affected by mathematical processing and (re-)publication of sources. Reusing information packaged as facts require checking, and validating, from conceptual confusion to sampling and calculation errors. Other professional issues arise from the potential of automated tools which allow the dissemination of publicly available data which has never been collated.

== Misuse of statistics ==
Applications of mathematics generally involve drawing conclusions from quantitative data. Due to uncertainties that mathematical models deal with, and challenges in drawing and communicating any conclusions, there is a possibility of mathematicians misleading the clients as they are not generally aware of quantitative techniques. To avoid such instances, statisticians codified their ethics in the 1980s in a declaration of the ISI, recognizing that there would often be conflicting demands from stakeholders, with ethical decisions a matter of professional judgment.

== Mathematical folklore ==
Priority and attribution of mathematical discovery are important to professional practice, even as some theorems bear the name of the person making the conjecture rather than finding the proof. Folk theorems, or mathematical folklore cannot be attributed to an individual, and may not have an agreed proof, despite being an accepted result, potentially leading to injustice.

== Ethics in pure mathematical research ==
The American Mathematical Society publishes a code of ethical guidelines for mathematical researchers. The responsibilities of researchers include being knowledgeable in the field, avoiding plagiarism, giving credit, publishing without unreasonable delay, and correcting errors. The European Mathematical Society Ethics Committee also publishes a code of practice relating to the publication, editing and refereeing of research.

It has been argued that as pure mathematical research is relatively harmless, it raises few urgent ethical issues. However, that raises the question of whether and why pure mathematics is ethically worth doing, given that it consumes the lives of many highly intelligent people who could be making more immediately useful contributions.

The study of ethical challenges in pure mathematics is deeply connected to the philosophy of mathematical practice. Arguments against the ethical neutrality of pure mathematical work often builds on the social constitution, i.e. the socio-cultural context of the research and the many decisions involved in mathematical proofs. The problem of epistemic injustice in mathematical research is actively discussed in this context.

== Parallels between ethics and mathematics ==
Ethics and mathematics both appear to rely on reasoning from intuition, unlike empirical sciences which rely fundamentally on observations and experiments. That has been suggested as a reason in support of objectivity or moral realism in ethics, since arguments against objectivity in ethics are paralleled by arguments against objectivity in mathematics, which is generally believed to be false.

Justin Clarke-Doane argues to the contrary that although mathematics and ethics are closely parallel, a pluralist attitude should be taken to the truths of both. Just as the parallel postulate is true in Euclidean geometry but false in non-Euclidean geometry, so ethical propositions can be true or false in different systems.

== Teaching ethics in mathematics ==
Courses in the ethics of mathematics remain rare. The University of New South Wales taught a compulsory course on Professional Issues and Ethics in Mathematics in its mathematics degrees from 1998 to 2012. In 2023, the ETH Zurich taught an optional seminar on ethics in mathematics and a non-examinable seminar also exists at the University of Cambridge. A mini-seminar has also been taught at Swarthmore College.

Many courses considering ethics in mathematics also appear under different names, e.g. "mathematics for social justice."

Similar approaches can also be found in the teaching of ethics to computer science students, where the term "embedded ethics" has established itself for the integration of ethics teaching into the curriculum. These programmes are currently explored at Harvard University, Stanford University and other places.

== See also ==
- Big data ethics – Ethics of mass data analytics
- Critical mathematics pedagogy – Liberation-focused math education
- Essentially contested concept – Problem in philosophy
- Ethical calculus – Application of mathematics to calculate issues in ethics
- Ethics of artificial intelligence
- Ethics of quantification
- Misuse of statistics – Use of statistical arguments to assert falsehoods
- Prosecutor's fallacy – Logic error due to ignoring the base rate
- Type I and type II errors – Concepts from statistical hypothesis testing
- Type III error – Term in statistical hypothesis testing
- Unintended consequences – Unforeseen outcomes of an action
