= Moral conviction =

Perception where attitude is attached to moral significance

Moral conviction refers to the perception that one's feelings about a given attitude are based on one's beliefs about right and wrong. Holding an attitude with moral conviction means that a person has attached moral significance to it.

== Description ==
A conviction is an unshakable belief in something without needing proof or evidence. Moral conviction, therefore, refers to a strong and absolute belief or attitude that something is right or wrong, moral or immoral. Moral convictions have a strong motivational force.

This is an important topic of research because moralization has the potential to both inspire activism and change and also to instigate divisiveness and great destruction.

Studies in social psychology indicate that moralization converts preferences into values, which act as moral imperatives, decreasing tolerance of differing opinions. This can lead to an increased willingness to accept violent solutions to conflicts. Moralized attitudes and opinions are more rigid than social conventions.

== Characteristics of moral conviction ==
People who hold moral convictions tend to perceive them as objectively true and universal in the sense that these should apply everywhere irrespective of the geographical location of time in history.

Moral convictions are often authority and peer-independent. People are less likely to be influenced by normative and majority influences. They are particularly resistant to conformity. Behavioral research in social psychology demonstrates that individuals who have a moral basis for their attitude or opinion are more likely to react against the group norm, or counter-conform. For instance, one study examined the reactions to a U.S. Supreme Court case which upheld States' ability to decide whether to legalize physician-assisted suicide: [Gonzales v. Oregon (2006)]. It was found that people's strength of moral conviction about physician-assisted suicide, and not their prior perceptions of the Supreme Court's legitimacy and fairness, was the strongest predictor of their perceptions of fairness and acceptance of the Court's decision in this case. Regardless of how legitimate they thought the Supreme Court was at baseline, morally convicted opponents of physician-assisted suicide perceived the decision to be unfair and nonbinding, whereas morally convicted opponents perceived the reverse.

== Psychological and neural mechanisms ==
A few studies in cognitive neuroscience have begun to identify the neural mechanisms underpinning moral conviction. One recent study, using psychophysics, electroencephalography, and measures of attitudes on sociopolitical issues found that metacognitive accuracy, the degree to which confidence judgments separate between correct and incorrect trials, moderates the relationship between moral conviction and social influence. Participants who were lower in metacognitive ability were those who hold stronger moralization views. This could explain why such individuals are more likely to have extreme or radical views. and are more immune to social influence. Another study using functional magnetic resonance imaging found that participants' average political moralization scores on specific sociopolitical issues were associated with a blunted response in prefrontal cortex and amygdala but increased neural activity in ventral striatum and ventromedial prefrontal cortex when they found political violence appropriate according to their own beliefs. The authors of that study concluded by suggesting that moral convictions about sociopolitical issues raise their subjective value, overriding our natural aversion to interpersonal harm.

== Usage in law ==
=== Canada ===
The Government of Canada's Employment Insurance Regulations describe one of the criteria that determines suitable employment as "the nature of the work is not contrary to the claimant’s moral convictions". Under Canadian employment insurance law, all current Employment Insurance claimants are responsible for accepting any offer of suitable employment while receiving EI regular and fishing benefits. Therefore, if a job offer goes against their moral convictions, they are allowed to decline it.

== Moral convictions in literature ==
In the opening chapter of the Book of Daniel (in the Hebrew Bible), Daniel holds fast to his conviction that he should not eat the food and drink prepared for King Nebuchadnezzar, because these would defile him.

== See also ==
- Conformity
- Ethics
- Ideology
- Morality
- Moral reasoning
- Political psychology
- Radical politics
- Science of morality
- Value (personal and cultural)
- Value theory
