= Michael Vocino =

American professor and librarian

- Born: 15 April 1946; Boston, Massachusetts

Michael Vocino (born April 15, 1946, in Boston, Massachusetts) is an American professor at the University of Rhode Island, where he was a former director of libraries, interim dean of libraries, and served as collection management officer. As of 2010, he serves as the University of Rhode Island Libraries gift librarian. Vocino also held a joint appointment in the political science department and since 1999 holds a joint appointment in the film/media program where he teaches courses in film history and film media. He did undergraduate work at Boston University, where he took courses with Howard Zinn. He did his graduate work at the University of Rhode Island and the Universiteit van Amsterdam. He has authored monographs on public ethics, labor relations serials, and local history as well as several book chapters and many scholarly articles on public ethics, labor relations serials, and cultural/film studies. He continues to run a blog covering Rhode Island politics, media, and gay rights.

He was elected to the national honor society of Phi Kappa Phi in graduate school for academic excellence and was a founding member of Teachers for a Democratic Society. He is a member of the national American Association of University Professors and is active in the local AAUP Chapter, where he is a member of the grievance committee and its chair.

Vocino's research interests continue to be information ethics, public ethics, minority rights, and the intersection of ethics and minority rights with film history/narrative and film theory. Vocino is the university bibliographer for political science, African American studies, gay studies, film/media, and military science for the University of Rhode Island. Vocino claims to be on the political left and is a passionate supporter of the labor movement and worker rights.

He lives in Kingston, Rhode Island, and on the Mezzogiorno's Gargano Peninsula during the summer months.

== Published monographs and book chapters ==
- "Befriending Death: 120 Views." Bloomington, IN: iUniverse, spring 2014.
- "Honor Society of Phi Kappa Phi: Celebrating One Hundred Years at the University of Rhode Island, 1913—2013." Kingston, RI: URI Phi Kappa Phi, 2013.
- "Perspectives on using e-journal usage statistics in a serials cancellation project," in "Library data : empowering practice and persuasion," Darby Orcutt, editor. Santa Barbara, CA: Libraries Unlimited, 2010.
- Ethical Decision Making in Public Administration. New York: Praeger Publishers, 1996. 220p.
- Labor and Industrial Relations Journals and Serials: An Analytical Guide. Westport, CT: Greenwood Press, 1989. 214p.
- "The FBI Looks It Up in the Library," in Practical Ethics in Public Administration2nd edition) by Geuras, Dean and Charles Garofalo. 2005.
- "A Coney Island of the Mind: Constructing, Storing and Retrieving Memory in Libraries," in Proceedings of Traveling Concepts III: Memory (Sponsored by Universiteit van Amsterdam and Cornell University), 2002.
- "Public Numbing and Private Profits: Titanic and Lesser Spectacles," in Proceedings of Event and Engagement Conference on Connecting Cultures (Sponsored by Universiteit van Amsterdam and Cornell University),1998.
- "A Model for Exploring Ethical Dilemmas with M.P.A. Faculty and Practitioners," in Teaching Ethics and Values (James Bowman, ed.) Albany, NY: State University of New York Press, 1997.
- "F.B.I. and Libraries," in Ethical Decision Making in Public Administration. New York: Praeger, 1996.
