= Ethical calculus =

Application of mathematics to calculate issues in ethics

An ethical calculus (also known as moral calculus) is the application of mathematics to calculate issues in ethics.

== Scope ==
Generally, ethical calculus refers to any method of determining a course of action in a circumstance that is not explicitly evaluated in one's ethical code.

A formal philosophy of ethical calculus is a development in the study of ethics, combining elements of natural selection, self-organizing systems, emergence, and algorithm theory. According to ethical calculus, the most ethical course of action in a situation is an absolute, but rather than being based on a static ethical code, the ethical code itself is a function of circumstances. The optimal ethic is the best possible course of action taken by an individual with the given limitations.

While ethical calculus is, in some ways, similar to moral relativism, the former finds its grounds in the circumstance while the latter depends on social and cultural context for moral judgment. Ethical calculus would most accurately be regarded as a form of dynamic moral absolutism.

Ethical calculus is not to be confused with ethics in mathematics or ethics of quantification which study the moral questions coming from mathematical practice and quantification in society.

== Examples ==
Francis Hutcheson devoted a section of his 1725 work Inquiry into the Original of our ideas and Beauty and Virtue to "an attempt to introduce a Mathematical Calculation in subjects of Morality". Formulas included:

- M = B × A

where,

- M is the moral importance of any agent
- B is the benevolence of the agent
- A is the ability of the agent

Another example is the felicific calculus formulated by utilitarian philosopher Jeremy Bentham for calculating the degree or amount of pleasure that a specific action is likely to cause. Bentham, an ethical hedonist, believed the moral rightness or wrongness of an action to be a function of the amount of pleasure or pain that it produced. The felicific calculus could, in principle at least, determine the moral status of any considered act.

== See also ==
- Ethics
- Felicific calculus
- Formal ethics
- Moral absolutism
- Morality
- Science of morality
