= Felicific calculus =

Algorithm in utilitarian ethics

The felicific calculus is an algorithm formulated by utilitarian philosopher Jeremy Bentham (1748–1832) for calculating the degree or amount of pleasure that a specific action is likely to induce. Bentham, an ethical hedonist, believed the moral rightness or wrongness of an action to be a function of the amount of pleasure or pain that it produced. The felicific calculus could, in principle, at least, determine the moral status of any considered act. The algorithm is also known as the utility calculus, the hedonistic calculus and the hedonic calculus.

To be included in this calculation are several variables (or vectors), which Bentham called "circumstances". These are:

1. Intensity: How strong is the pleasure?
2. Duration: How long will the pleasure last?
3. Certainty or uncertainty: How likely or unlikely is it that the pleasure will occur?
4. Propinquity or remoteness: How soon will the pleasure occur?
5. Fecundity: The probability that the action will be followed by sensations of the same kind.
6. Purity: The probability that it will not be followed by sensations of the opposite kind.
7. Extent: How many people will be affected?

== Bentham's instructions ==
To take an exact account of the general tendency of any act, by which the interests of a community are affected, proceed as follows. Begin with any one person of those whose interests seem most immediately to be affected by it: and take an account,

- Of the value of each distinguishable pleasure which appears to be produced by it in the first instance.
- Of the value of each pain which appears to be produced by it in the first instance.
- Of the value of each pleasure which appears to be produced by it after the first. This constitutes the fecundity of the first pleasure and the impurity of the first pain.
- Of the value of each pain which appears to be produced by it after the first. This constitutes the fecundity of the first pain, and the impurity of the first pleasure.
- Sum up all the values of all the pleasures on the one side, and those of all the pains on the other. The balance, if it be on the side of pleasure, will give the good tendency of the act upon the whole, with respect to the interests of that individual person; if on the side of pain, the bad tendency of it upon the whole.
- Take an account of the number of persons whose interests appear to be concerned; and repeat the above process with respect to each. Sum up the numbers expressive of the degrees of good tendency, which the act has, with respect to each individual, in regard to whom the tendency of it is good upon the whole. Do this again with respect to each individual, in regard to whom the tendency of it is bad upon the whole. Take the balance which if on the side of pleasure, will give the general good tendency of the act, with respect to the total number or community of individuals concerned; if on the side of pain, the general evil tendency, with respect to the same community.

To make his proposal easier to remember, Bentham devised what he called a "mnemonic doggerel" (also referred to as "memoriter verses"), which synthesized "the whole fabric of morals and legislation":

Intense, long, certain, speedy, fruitful, pure—

Such marks in pleasures and in pains endure.
Such pleasures seek if private be thy end:
If it be public, wide let them extend
Such pains avoid, whichever be thy view:

If pains must come, let them extend to few.

== Jevons' economics ==
W. Stanley Jevons used the algebra of pleasure and pain in his science of utility applied to economics. He described utility with graphs where marginal utility continuously declines. His figure 9 on page 173 has two curves: one for the painfulness of labour and the other for utility of production. As the amount of product increases there is a point where a "balance of pain" is reached and labour ceases.

== Hedonimetry ==
Hedonimetry is the study of happiness ("experienced utility") as a measurable economic asset. The first major work in the field was an 1881 publication of Mathematical Psychics by the famous statistician and economist Francis Ysidro Edgeworth, who hypothesized a way of measuring happiness in units.

The concept of measuring hedonic utility arose in Utilitarianism, with Classical Utilitarians acknowledging that the actual pleasure might not be easy to express quantitatively as a numeric value. Bentham, the early proponent of the concept, declared that the happiness is a sequence of episodes, each characterized by its intensity and duration. This definition formally makes episodes permutable, as the total pleasure does not depend on their order. Since practical experience teaches otherwise (enjoyment from a meal does depend on the order of courses), followers of Bentham argued that the order of episodes changes their intensity.

== See also ==
- Act utilitarianism
- Bellman equation
- Epicurus
- Ethical calculus
- Reinforcement learning
- Science of morality
- Utilitarian social choice rule - a mathematical formula for felicific calculus.

== Sources ==
- Skyrms, Brian; Narens, Louis (2019). "Measuring the hedonimeter". Philosophical Studies. 176 (12): 3199–3210. doi:10.1007/s11098-018-1170-z. ISSN 0031-8116.
