= Jonckheere (disambiguation) =

Jonckheere may refer to:

- Jonckheere, Belgian motor coach and bus builder
- Aimable Robert Jonckheere (1920–2005), French statistician and psychologist
- Robert Jonckhèere (1888–1974), French astronomer

== See also ==
- Jonkheer
