= Concordant pair =

In statistics, a concordant pair is a pair of observations, each on two variables, (X_{1},Y_{1}) and (X_{2},Y_{2}), having the property that

$$\sgn (X_2 - X_1)\ = \sgn (Y_2 - Y_1),$$

where "sgn" refers to whether a number is positive, zero, or negative (its sign). Specifically, the signum function, often represented as sgn, is defined as:

$$\sgn x = \begin{cases}
-1,  &  x < 0 \\
0 ,  &  x = 0 \\
1 ,  &  x > 0
\end{cases}$$

That is, in a concordant pair, both elements of one pair are either greater than, equal to, or less than the corresponding elements of the other pair.

In contrast, a discordant pair is a pair of two-variable observations such that

$$\sgn (X_2 - X_1)\ = - \sgn (Y_2 - Y_1).$$

That is, if one pair contains a higher value of X then the other pair contains a higher value of Y.

== Uses ==
The Kendall tau distance between two series is the total number of discordant pairs. The Kendall tau rank correlation coefficient, which measures how closely related two series of numbers are, is proportional to the difference between the number of concordant pairs and the number of discordant pairs. An estimate of Goodman and Kruskal's gamma, another measure of rank correlation, is given by the ratio of the difference to the sum of the numbers of concordant and discordant pairs. Somers' D is another similar but asymmetric measure given by the ratio of the difference in the number of concordant and discordant pairs to the number of pairs with unequal values for one of the two variables.

== See also ==
- Spearman's rank correlation coefficient
