= Rank test =

Type of statistical test

In statistics, a rank test is any test involving ranks. Rank tests are related to permutation tests.

The motivation to test differences between samples is that ranks are in some sense maximally invariant to monotone transformations. This may be important when there is outliers or when dealing with ordinal data.

== Examples of rank tests ==
- Wilcoxon signed-rank test
- Kruskal–Wallis test
  - Mann–Whitney U test (special case)
- Page's trend test
- Friedman test
- Rank products
- Cucconi test
- Lepage test
