= Leo Goodman =

American statistician and sociologist (1928–2020)

Leo A. Goodman
- Born: August 7, 1928; Brooklyn, New York, U.S.
- Died: December 22, 2020 (aged 92); Berkeley, California, U.S.
- Education: Syracuse University, Princeton University
- Known for: Social statistics, Goodman and Kruskal's lambda, Goodman and Kruskal's gamma
- Awards: R. A. Fisher Lectureship (1968); Wilks Memorial Award (1985)
- Scientific career
- Fields: Statistics
- Workplaces: University of Chicago, University of California, Berkeley
- Doctoral advisor: John Tukey, Samuel S. Wilks

Leo Aria Goodman (August 7, 1928 – December 22, 2020) was an American statistician. He was known particularly for developing statistical methods for the social sciences, including statistical methods for analyzing categorical data and data from statistical surveys.

== Education ==
Goodman was born in Brooklyn. He attended Stuyvesant High School and he then went on to earn his AB degree summa cum laude from Syracuse University in 1948, majoring in mathematics and sociology. He was class valedictorian. He moved to Princeton for postgraduate work in mathematical statistics, receiving his masters and doctorate in 1950.

== Work ==
Goodman began his career in 1950 at the University of Chicago, where he would stay, save for a number of visiting professorships, until 1987. Since 1987, he has been Class of 1938 Professor in the Sociology Department and the Statistics Department at the University of California, Berkeley.

== Awards and distinctions ==
He was elected as a Fellow of the American Statistical Association in 1956, a member of the American Academy of Sciences in 1973, a member of the United States National Academy of Sciences in 1974, and a member of the American Philosophical Society in 1976.

== Personal life and death ==
He was married to Ann Davidow; the marriage ended in divorce. He and his ex-wife had two children and were godparents to Sylvia Plath's first child, Frieda Hughes.

Goodman died from COVID-19 during the COVID-19 pandemic in California.
