= Kendall test =

The Kendall test may refer to:

- Kendall tau rank correlation coefficient, also called the Kendall tau test
- A test of the strength of the abdominal muscles during a physical examination
