= Gamma test =

Gamma test may refer to:

- Gamma test (statistics)
- An alternate name for "release candidate" in the software release life cycle
