= Robert John Audley =

British psychologist (1928–2020)

- Born: 1928; London
- Died: 2020 (aged 91–92)
- Education: University College London
- Scientific career
- Fields: Experimental psychology
- Workplaces: University College London
- Thesis: Stochastic processes and the description of learning behaviour in choice situations. (1956)
- Doctoral advisor: A.R. Jonckheere
- Doctoral students: Peter Howell

Robert John Audley was a British psychologist whose research was concerned with choice and decision-making.

== Career ==
Robert (Bob) Audley was born in London in 1925. Following national service, he obtained his BSc from University College London in 1949. Among his lecturers was E.S. Pearson. He then obtained a Fulbright scholarship which took him to Washington State University. On his return he completed a PhD supervised by A.R. Jonckheere at UCL. He was appointed to the faculty and remained there for the whole of his academic career. He served as head of department.

He was active in the British Psychological Society of which he became president in 1981. His Presidential address was on the subject of choice. He was Editor of the British Journal of Mathematical and Statistical Psychology from 1963 to 1969. He was also President of the Experimental Psychology Society about which he was interviewed.

== Research ==
There were three strands to his research. The first strand, as a mathematical psychologist, he developed a Theory of Choice to explain the process of decision-making (Audley, 1960; Audley & Pike, 1965). His second strand was on reaction time (Audley, Caudrey, Howell and Powell, 1975) and the third was on medical accidents (Audley, Vincents & Ennis, 1993).

== Publications ==
- Audley, R.J. (1960). A stochastic model for individual choice behaviour.
- Audley, R.J., & Pike, A.R. (1965). Some alternative models of choice.
- Audley, R.J. (1970). Choosing.
- Audley RJ; Caudrey DJ; Howell P; Powell DJ (1975) Reaction Time Exchange Functions in Choice Tasks. In Attention and Performance V, (pp. 281–295).
- Audley, R.J., Vincent, C., & Ennis, M. (Eds)(1993) Medical Accidents. OUP.

== Positions ==
- 1969: President, British Psychological Society
- 1975: President, Experimental Psychology Society
