= Peter Howell (psychologist) =

British psychologist

- Education: University of Bradford (BSc); University College London (PhD)
- Known for: Stuttering; Speech production
- Scientific career
- Fields: Stuttering; Speech perception; Speech production; Cognitive neuroscience; Hearing
- Workplaces: University College London
- Thesis: (1983)
- Doctoral advisor: Robert John Audley
- Doctoral students: Sophie Scott
- Website: ucl.ac.uk/pals/research/experimental-psychology/person/peter-howell/

Peter Howell is a British psychologist and Professor of Experimental Psychology at University College London (UCL). His research is focused on speech and hearing, particularly stuttering, speech perception and speech production.

== Education and early life ==
Peter Howell obtained a BSc degree in Psychology and Sociology from University of Bradford. Later he moved to UCL to work as a research assistant with Professor Robert Audley. His next position, as a programmer, was at University of Sussex with Professor Chris Darwin who sparked Howell's interest in speech. This led him to pursue a PhD at UCL under the supervision of Professor Robert Audley.

== Career and research ==
After completing his PhD, Howell joined the UCL and started working on speech production. His interest in the interaction between speech perception and production led to studying stuttering. Howell's additional research interests include hearing and music. Howell helped to internationalize speech science awareness and develop research facilities in several countries: Iran, China, Japan, Brazil, Jordan, Pakistan and Qatar.

== Works ==
- Howell, Peter (2016). Recovery from Stuttering. Psychology Press.
- Rosen, Stuart; Howell, Peter (2010). Signals and Systems for Speech and Hearing (Second ed.). Emerald.
