= Sophie Scott =

British neuroscientist

Sophie Scott FMedSci FBA
- Scott in 2026
- Born: Sophie Kerttu Scott; 16 November 1966 (age 59); Blackburn, England
- Education: Westholme School; Queen Elizabeth's Grammar School, Blackburn
- Alma mater: Polytechnic of Central London (BSc); University College London (PhD)
- Known for: Neuroscience; Stand-up comedy
- Awards: Royal Institution Christmas Lectures (2017)
- Scientific career
- Fields: Cognitive neuroscience; Speech perception; Speech production; Vocal emotions; Human communication
- Workplaces: University College London
- Thesis: Perceptual centers in speech-acoustic determinants (1993)
- Doctoral advisor: Peter Howell
- Scott's voice recorded June 2014
- Website: ucl.ac.uk/pals/people/profiles/academic-staff/sophie-scott

Sophie Kerttu Scott (born 16 November 1966) is a British neuroscientist and Wellcome Trust Senior Fellow at University College London (UCL). Her research investigates the cognitive neuroscience of voices, speech and laughter particularly speech perception, speech production, vocal emotions and human communication. She also serves as director of UCL's Institute of Cognitive Neuroscience.

== Education and early life ==
Scott was born in Blackburn, England to Colin Mountford Scott and Christine Winnifred Scott. She was educated at Westholme School and Queen Elizabeth's Grammar School, Blackburn. She completed a Bachelor of Science degree in life sciences at the Polytechnic of Central London (now the University of Westminster) in 1990 followed by research on cognitive science in 1993 supervised by Peter Howell and a PhD at University College London in 1994.

== Career and research ==
Scott started her research career in Cambridge at the Medical Research Council (MRC) Cognition and Brain Sciences Unit, formerly known as the Applied Psychology Unit. She returned to UCL as a research fellow in 1998. She was awarded a Wellcome Trust Fellowship in 2001 and has been funded by them since. As of 2017 she holds a Wellcome Trust Senior Fellowship. She is a member of the British Psychological Society, the Society for Neuroscience, the Cognitive Neuroscience Society, and the Experimental Psychology Society.

Scott is head of the Speech Communication Group at UCL's Institute of Cognitive Neuroscience. Her research investigates the neural basis of vocal communication – how our brains process the information in speech and voices, and how our brains control the production of our voice. Within this, her research covers the roles of streams of processing in auditory cortex, hemispheric asymmetries, and the interaction of speech processing with attentional and working memory factors. Other interests include individual differences in speech perception and plasticity in speech perception, since these are important factors for people with cochlear implants. She is also interested in the expression of emotion in the voice and the neuroscience of laughter.

=== Public engagement ===
Scott is known for her public engagement work, including performing standup comedy, and was featured in a September 2013 edition of the BBC Radio Four programme The Life Scientific. In March 2014, she was invited to give a Friday Evening Discourse at the Royal Institution on the science of laughter. Her work on laughter has also toured science fairs and exhibitions as part of the Laughter lab project. She has been awarded a UCL Provost's Award for Public engagement. Scott presented the Royal Institution Christmas Lectures in 2017 entitled The Language of Life which explored the topic of communication.

Scott has been a panel guest several times on BBC Radio 4 programme The Infinite Monkey Cage on episodes covering neuroscience, reality and the human voice. She is also a regular contributor to the BBC Radio 4 programme Curious Cases.

In 2016, she appeared on the BBC TV series Horizon, The Science of Laughter with comedian Jimmy Carr.

=== Awards and honours ===
Scott was elected a Fellow of the Academy of Medical Sciences (FMedSci) in 2012. Her citation on election to the Academy of Medical Sciences reads:

She has drawn together theories and techniques from speech sciences, psychology and primate neuroanatomy in order to understand how the human brain processes speech. Her work was the first to identify that the early perceptual processing of speech parallels the perception of conspecific calls in non-human primate brains. This has contributed to our understanding of recovery from aphasic stroke. She has applied this work to hearing loss, with particular reference to how people can adapt to cochlear implantation. She is now extending her work to understanding the social aspects of communication.

In 2015 Scott spoke at the TED conference and was elected a Fellow of the British Academy (FBA) in 2016.

She was appointed Commander of the Order of the British Empire (CBE) in the 2020 Birthday Honours for services to neuroscience.

Media offices
Preceded by Saiful Islam	Royal Institution Christmas Lecturer; 2017	Succeeded by Alice Roberts and Aoife McLysaght
