= Page's trend test =

In statistics, the Page test for multiple comparisons between ordered correlated variables is the counterpart of Spearman's rank correlation coefficient which summarizes the association of continuous variables. It is also known as Page's trend test or Page's L test. It is a repeated measure trend test.

The Page test is useful where:

- there are three or more conditions,
- a number of subjects (or other randomly sampled entities) are all observed in each of them, and
- we predict that the observations will have a particular order.

For example, a number of subjects might each be given three trials at the same task, and we predict that performance will improve from trial to trial. A test of the significance of the trend between conditions in this situation was developed by Ellis Batten Page (1963). More formally, the test considers the null hypothesis that, for n conditions, where m_{i} is a measure of the central tendency of the ith condition,

$$m_1 = m_2 = m_3 = \cdots = m_n\,$$

against the alternative hypothesis that

$$m_1 < m_2 < m_3 < \cdots < m_n.\,$$

It has more statistical power than the Friedman test against the alternative that there is a difference in trend. Friedman's test considers the alternative hypothesis that the central tendencies of the observations under the n conditions are different without specifying their order.

Procedure for the Page test, with k subjects each exposed to n conditions:

- Arrange the n conditions in the order implied by the alternative hypothesis, and assign each of them a rank Y_{i.}
- For each of the k subjects separately, rank the n observations from 1 to n.
- Add the ranks for each condition to give a total X_{i}.
- Multiply X_{i} by Y_{i} and add all the products together; this sum is called L.
- To test whether there is a significant trend, values of L can be compared with those tabulated by Page (1963).

Alternatively, the quantity

$${ (12L - 3kn(n+1)^2)^2 \over kn^2(n^2 - 1)(n + 1) }$$

may be compared with values of the chi-squared distribution with one degree of freedom. This gives a two-tailed test. The approximation is reliable for more than 20 subjects with any number of conditions, for more than 12 subjects when there are 4 or more conditions, and for any number of subjects when there are 9 or more conditions.

- If a measure of the overall correlation between the conditions and the data is required, it can be calculated as

ρ = 12L/k(n^{3} − n) − 3(n + 1)/(n − 1)

if k = 1, this reduces to the familiar Spearman coefficient.

The Page test is most often used with fairly small numbers of conditions and subjects. The minimum values of L for significance at the 0.05 level, one-tailed, with three conditions, are 56 for 4 subjects (the lowest number that is capable of giving a significant result at this level), 54 for 5 subjects, 91 for 7 subjects, 128 for 10 subjects, 190 for 15 subjects and 251 for 20 subjects..

A corresponding extension of Kendall's tau was developed by Jonckheere (1954).
