= Coefficient of colligation =

Measure of association between two binary variables

In statistics, Yule's Y, also known as the coefficient of colligation, is a measure of association between two binary variables. The measure was developed by George Udny Yule in 1912, and should not be confused with Yule's coefficient for measuring skewness based on quartiles.

== Formula ==
For a 2×2 table for binary variables U and V with frequencies or proportions

	V = 0	V = 1
U = 0	a	b
U = 1	c	d

Yule's Y is given by

$$Y = \frac{\sqrt{ad}-\sqrt{bc}}{\sqrt{ad}+\sqrt{bc}}.$$

Yule's Y is closely related to the odds ratio OR = ad/(bc) as is seen in following formula:

$$Y = \frac{\sqrt{OR}-1}{\sqrt{OR}+1}$$

Yule's Y varies from −1 to +1. −1 reflects total negative correlation, +1 reflects perfect positive association while 0 reflects no association at all. These correspond to the values for the more common Pearson correlation.

Yule's Y is also related to the similar Yule's Q, which can also be expressed in terms of the odds ratio. Q and Y are related by:

$$Q = \frac{2Y}{1+Y^2}\ ,$$
$$Y = \frac{1-\sqrt{1-Q^2}}{Q}\ .$$

== Interpretation ==
Yule's Y gives the fraction of perfect association in per unum (multiplied by 100 it represents this fraction in a more familiar percentage). Indeed, the formula transforms the original 2×2 table in a crosswise symmetric table wherein b = c = 1 and a = d = √OR.

For a crosswise symmetric table with frequencies or proportions a = d and b = c it is very easy to see that it can be split up in two tables. In such tables association can be measured in a perfectly clear way by dividing (a – b) by (a + b). In transformed tables b has to be substituted by 1 and a by √OR. The transformed table has the same degree of association (the same OR) as the original not-crosswise symmetric table. Therefore, the association in asymmetric tables can be measured by Yule's Y, interpreting it in just the same way as with symmetric tables. Of course, Yule's Y and (a − b)/(a + b) give the same result in crosswise symmetric tables, presenting the association as a fraction in both cases.

Yule's Y measures association in a substantial, intuitively understandable way and therefore it is the measure of preference to measure association.

== Examples ==
The following crosswise symmetric table

	V = 0	V = 1
U = 0	40	10
U = 1	10	40

can be split up into two tables:

	V = 0	V = 1
U = 0	10	10
U = 1	10	10

and

	V = 0	V = 1
U = 0	30	0
U = 1	0	30

It is obvious that the degree of association equals 0.6 per unum (60%).

The following asymmetric table can be transformed in a table with an equal degree of association (the odds ratios of both tables are equal).

	V = 0	V = 1
U = 0	3	1
U = 1	3	9

Here follows the transformed table:

	V = 0	V = 1
U = 0	3	1
U = 1	1	3

The odds ratios of both tables are equal to 9. Y = (3 − 1)/(3 + 1) = 0.5 (50%)
