= Bruce Cooil =

American statistician

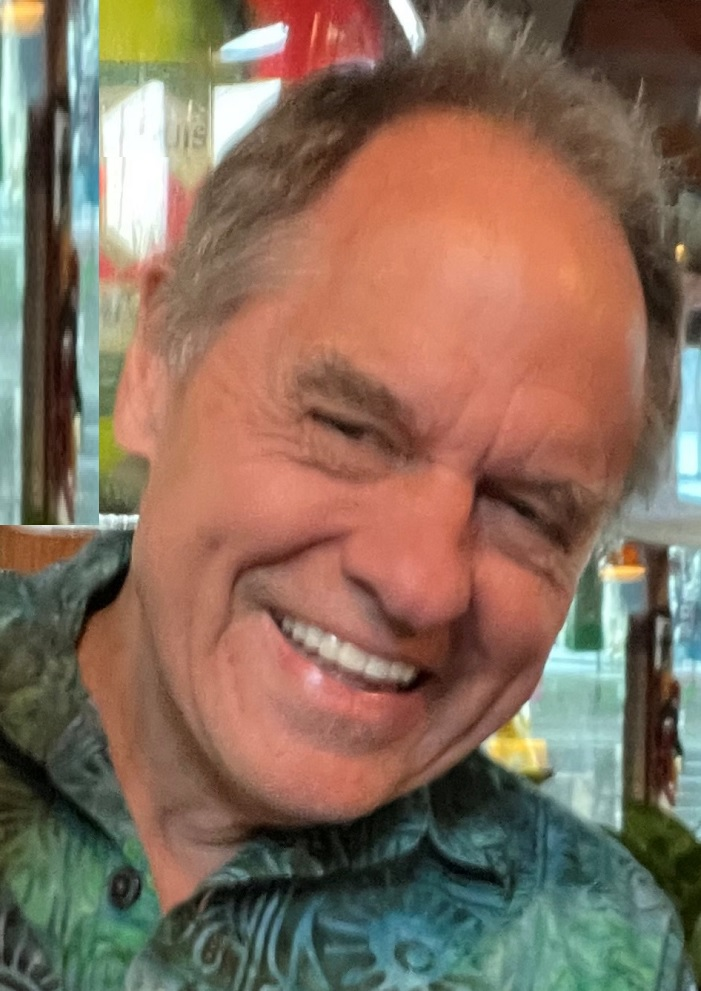
- Bruce Cooil in 2022
- Born: 1953 (age 72–73); Honolulu
- Education: Stanford University (BSc and MSc); University of Pennsylvania (PhD)
- Occupation: Statistical modeller
- Employer: Vanderbilt University

Bruce Cooil (born 1953) is The Dean Samuel B. and Evelyn R. Richmond Emeritus Professor of Management at Vanderbilt University in the Owen Graduate School of Management. His main areas of research are statistical modelling and its application to decrease mortality and morbidity rates due to coronary heart disease and what can be done to improve the healthcare of impoverished regions like Mozambique.

== Life and work ==
Cooil was born in Honolulu, Hawaii, in 1953. Cooil received his BSc in Mathematics at Stanford University in 1975, MSc in Statistics at Stanford University in 1976, and PhD in Statistics at the University of Pennsylvania in 1982 before joining Vanderbilt University's faculty in 1982.

In addition to Cooil's statistical modeling research in healthcare, his statistical modeling research in business marketing focuses on customer loyalty issues where he received a number of awards for his findings in the fallacy of the Net Promoter customer loyalty metric, and in predicting changes in existing customer spending habits more accurately through the use of customer perception questions. Also in the field of statistics, he created the concept of proportional reduction in loss, a general framework for developing and evaluating measures of the reliability of particular ways of making observations which are possibly subject to errors of all types. Cooil has won the annual Dean's Award for Teaching Excellence six times.

== Selected works ==
- Larsen, Richard J. (1997). Statistics for applied problem solving and decision making. Morris L. Marx, Bruce Cooil. Pacific Grove, CA: Duxbury Press. ISBN 0-534-93084-0. OCLC 35574510.
