= Lepage test =

Statistical test

In statistics, the Lepage test is an exact distribution-free test (nonparametric test) for jointly monitoring the location (central tendency) and scale (variability) in two-sample treatment versus control comparisons. It is a rank test for the two-sample location-scale problem. The Lepage test statistic is the squared Euclidean distance of the standardized Wilcoxon rank-sum test for location and the standardized Ansari–Bradley test for scale. The Lepage test was first introduced by Yves Lepage in 1971 in a paper in Biometrika. A large number of Lepage-type tests exists in statistical literature for simultaneously testing location and scale shifts in case-control studies. The details may be found in the book: Nonparametric statistical tests: A computational approach. Wolfgang Kössler in 2006 also introduced various Lepage type tests using some alternative score functions optimal for various distributions. Amitava Mukherjee and Marco Marozzi introduced a class of percentile modified versions of the Lepage test. An alternative to the Lepage-type tests is known as the Cucconi test proposed by Odoardo Cucconi in 1968.

== Conducting the Lepage test with R ==
Practitioners can apply the Lepage test using the pLepage function of the contributory package NSM3, built under R software. Andreas Schulz and Markus Neuhäuser also provided detailed R code for computation of test statistic and p-value of the Lepage test for the users.

== Application in statistical process monitoring ==
In recent years, the Lepage statistic is a widely used statistical process for monitoring and quality control. In 2012, Amitava Mukherjee and Subhabrata Chakraborti introduced a distribution-free Shewhart-type Phase-II monitoring scheme (control chart) for simultaneously monitoring of location and scale parameter of a process using a test sample of fixed size, when a reference sample of sufficiently large size is available from an in-control population. Later in 2015, the same statisticians along with Shovan Chowdhury, proposed a distribution-free CUSUM-type Phase-II monitoring scheme based on the Lepage statistic. In 2017, Mukherjee further designed an EWMA-type distribution-free Phase-II monitoring scheme for joint monitoring of location and scale. In the same year, Mukherjee, with Marco Marozzi, known for promoting the Cucconi test, came together to design the Circular-Grid Lepage chart – a new type of joint monitoring scheme.

== Multisample version of the Lepage test ==
In 2005, František Rublìk introduced the multisample version of the original two-sample Lepage test.

== See also ==
- Cucconi test
- permutation test
