= Aimable Robert Jonckheere =

French statistician and psychologist

- Born: 25 May 1920; Hem, France
- Died: 24 September 2005 (aged 85); London
- Known for: Jonckheere's trend test

Academic background
- Education: University College London
- Thesis: A study of 'fixation' behaviour in the rat (1956)

Academic work
- Discipline: Psychology, Statistics
- Doctoral students: Gordon Pask

Aimable Robert Jonckheere (25 May 1920 – 24 September 2005), commonly known by friends and colleagues as "Jonck", was a psychologist and statistician at University College London (UCL). He is known for his work in nonparametric statistics, including the development of the eponymous Jonckheere's trend test.

== Early life ==
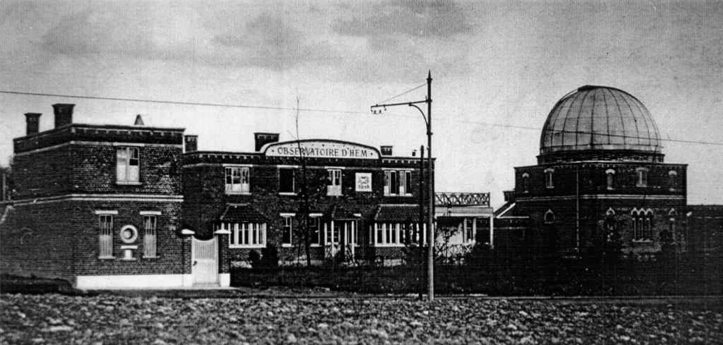
Observatory at Hem (photo from around 1909) where Jonckheere was born

Jonckheere was born in Hem, near Lille in France, in a house attached to an observatory. His father was Robert Jonckhèere, a French astronomer known for discovering 3350 double stars. During World War II Jonckheere was a conscientious objector in Jersey, where he remained during the German Occupation of the Channel Islands. Jonckheere took a first class degree in psychology with statistics in 1949 and a PhD in 1956, both from UCL.

== Work ==
Jonckheere is best known for his work in nonparametric statistics, approaches which make fewer assumptions about the theoretical distribution of the data than parametric statistics. In this field he developed what is now known as Jonckheere's trend test, a method which is implemented in SPSS, a statistical package favoured by social scientists, and R, widely used by statisticians. He published little; however, he influenced many people's ideas and work, with traces of conversations and advice throughout UCL and beyond.

Jonckheere visited and left his mark at the International Centre for Genetic Epistemology in Geneva, where Jean Piaget forbade him from leaving unless he could find an equally able replacement. Jonckheere coauthored a book with Piaget and Benoit Mandelbrot on mental development. Other people Jonck worked with or was associated with include J. B. S. Haldane, A. J. Ayer, Cyril Burt, Hans Eysenck, and Ernst Gombrich.

Robert John Audley's (1956) University of London PhD thesis acknowledgement illustrates the kind of support that was common from Jonckheere; Audley writes that "much of the thesis is the result of long periods of almost daily argument with him." The fruits of this collaboration led to the Audley-Jonckheere stochastic model of learning. This also illustrates one of Jonckheere's main loves, applying mathematical analysis to psychological science. But Jonckheere's interests were much broader than mathematics. For example, although he worked at (what is now) the UCL Division of Psychology and Language Sciences, he also gave lectures at the Slade School of Fine Art there, one of the top art schools in the UK. He taught a Theoretical Issues course to final year psychology students at Birkbeck College. He earned a reputation for devouring books and being able to talk with assurance on a broad range of topics.
