= Cucconi test =

Nonparametric test in statistics

In statistics, the Cucconi test is a nonparametric test for jointly comparing central tendency and variability (detecting location and scale changes) in two samples. Many rank tests have been proposed for the two-sample location-scale problem. Nearly all of them are Lepage-type tests, that is a combination of a location test and a scale test. The Cucconi test was first proposed by Odoardo Cucconi in 1968.

The Cucconi test is not as familiar as other location-scale tests but it is of interest for several reasons. First, from a historical point of view, it was proposed some years before the Lepage test, the standard rank test for the two-sample location-scale problem. Secondly, as opposed to other location-scale tests, the Cucconi test is not a combination of location and scale tests. Thirdly, it compares favorably with Lepage type tests in terms of power and type-one error probability and very importantly it is easier to be computed because it requires only the ranks of one sample in the combined sample, whereas the other tests also require scores of various types as well as to permutationally estimate mean and variance of test statistics because their analytic formulae are not available.

The Cucconi test is based on the following statistic:

$$\text{CUC} = \frac{U^2 + V^2 - 2\rho UV}{2(1-\rho^2)}.$$

where $U$ is based on the standardized sum of squared ranks of the first sample elements in the pooled sample, and $V$ is based on the standardized sum of squared contrary-ranks of the first sample elements in the pooled sample. $\rho$ is the correlation coefficient between $U$ and $V$. The test statistic rejects for large values, a table of critical values is available. The p-value can be easily computed via permutations.

The interest on this test has recently increased spanning applications in many different fields like hydrology, applied psychology and industrial quality control.

== See also ==
- Lepage test
