= Tukey's trend test =

Statistical test for dose-response trends

Tukey's trend test (or the Tukey-Ciminera-Heyse trend test) is a non-parametric or semi-parametric statistical hypothesis test used to detect a dose–response relationship between a discrete independent variable (such as dosage level) and a continuous dependent variable.

First proposed by John Tukey, Joseph Ciminera, and John Heyse in 1985, the test was developed to address the limitations of simple linear regression when the exact functional form of the dose-response curve is unknown. It is frequently applied in toxicology and pharmacology to determine if increasing exposure to a substance correlates with a monotonic increase or decrease in a biological response.

== Background ==
In clinical and laboratory experiments, researchers often test a control group alongside several increasing dose levels (e.g., control, low, medium, and high). While a one-way ANOVA can identify differences between dose groups, it does not account for the ordered nature of the doses. On the other hand, standard linear regression assumes a strictly linear relationship, which may fail to detect trends that are concave, convex, or step functions.

Tukey's trend test provides a robust alternative by using a "maximum-type" test statistic. It simultaneously considers multiple possible "shapes" of the trend, reducing the risk of a Type II error when the true dose-response shape is non-linear.

== Methodology ==
The test typically evaluates a null hypothesis ($H_0$) of no trend against an alternative hypothesis ($H_A$) of a monotonic trend.

=== Scoring shapes ===
The original Tukey trend test employs three different sets of scores ($x$) to represent potential dose-response shapes:

1. Arithmetic: assumes equal increments between doses (e.g., 0, 1, 2, 3).
2. Ordinal: ranks the doses regardless of their physical value (e.g., 1, 2, 3, 4)
3. Logarithmic: assumes the effect is proportional to the logarithm of the dose (e.g., $0, \ln(d_{1}+1), \ln(d_{2}+1), \dots$

=== Test statistic and correlation ===
Testing for a trend is treated as a regression problem. For each set of scores, a t-statistic is calculated, based on the Pearson correlation coefficient ($r$) between the response ($Y$) and the assigned dose scores ($x$). For each score, its corresponding t-statistic is defined as:

$$t=\frac{r\sqrt{n-2}}{\sqrt{1-r^2}}$$

where $n$ is the total number of observations. The t-statistics are denoted $t_\text{arith}$, $t_\text{ord}$, and $t_\log$ respectively, and quantify the level of "statistical certainty" that the slope of the relationship is non-zero. The final test statistic is formed as the maximum of these individual statistics:

$$T_\max = \max\left(t_\text{arith}, t_\text{ord}, t_\log\right)$$

Because $T_\max$ is the maximum of several correlated statistics, it does not follow a standard Student's t-distribution. Instead, the corresponding p-value must be adjusted, either via a multivariate t-distribution or through permutation methods.

== Significance and regulatory context ==
It is often cited as a precursor to the Multiple Comparison Procedures and Modeling (MCP-MOD) approach. While Tukey's 1985 test used a fixed set of three contrasts, MCP-MOD generalizes this to any number of candidate parametric models.

In 2014, the European Medicines Agency (EMA) issued a positive qualification opinion on MCP-MOD as an efficient methodology for Phase II dose-finding studies. The Food and Drug Administration gave a similar endorsement in 2016.

== Comparison to other tests ==
Unlike the Jonckheere's trend test, which is fully non-parametric and based on ranks, Tukey's trend test is more closely related to regression-based approaches.
