= Rank product =

The rank product is a biologically motivated rank test for the detection of differentially expressed genes in replicated microarray experiments. It is a simple non-parametric statistical method based on ranks of fold changes. In addition to its use in expression profiling, it can be used to combine ranked lists in various application domains, including proteomics, metabolomics, statistical meta-analysis, and general feature selection.

== Calculation of the rank product ==
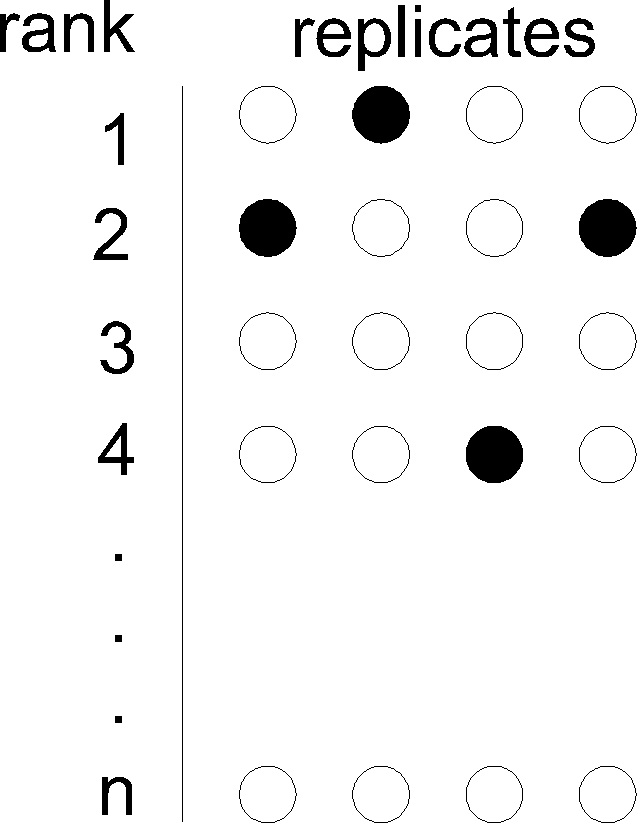
Filled circles represent ranks of one gene in the different replicates. The rank product for this gene would be (2×1×4×2)^{1/4} = 2

Given n genes and k replicates, let $r_{g,i}$ be the rank of gene g in the i-th replicate.

Compute the rank product via the geometric mean:

$$RP(g)=(\Pi_{i=1}^kr_{g,i})^{1/k}$$

== Determination of significance levels ==
Simple permutation-based estimation is used to determine how likely a given RP value or better is observed in a random experiment.

1. generate p permutations of k rank lists of length n.
2. calculate the rank products of the n genes in the p permutations.
3. count how many times the rank products of the genes in the permutations are smaller or equal to the observed rank product. Set c to this value.
4. calculate the average expected value for the rank product by: $\mathrm{E}_{\mathrm{RP}}(g)=c/p$.
5. calculate the percentage of false positives as : $\mathrm{pfp}(g)=\mathrm{E}_{RP}(g)/\mathrm{rank}(g)$ where $\mathrm{rank}(g)$ is the rank of gene g in a list of all n genes sorted by increasing $\mathrm{RP}$.

== Exact probability distribution and accurate approximation ==
Permutation re-sampling requires a computationally demanding number of permutations to get reliable estimates of the p-values for the most differentially expressed genes, if n is large. Eisinga, Breitling and Heskes (2013) provide the exact probability mass distribution of the rank product statistic. Calculation of the exact p-values offers a substantial improvement over permutation approximation, most significantly for that part of the distribution rank product analysis is most interested in, i.e., the thin right tail. However, exact statistical significance of large rank products may take unacceptable long amounts of time to compute. Heskes, Eisinga and Breitling (2014) provide a method to determine accurate approximate p-values of the rank product statistic in a computationally fast manner.

== See also ==
- Ranking
- Schulze method
- Comparison of electoral systems
- Arrow's impossibility theorem
