= Robert Jonckhèere =

French astronomer

Robert Jonckhèere (25 July 1888, Roubaix – 27 June 1974, Marseille) was a French astronomer. He is known for his discovery of more than 3350 double stars. A. R. Jonckhèere, psychologist and statistician at University College London, was his son.

== Biography ==
=== Youth ===
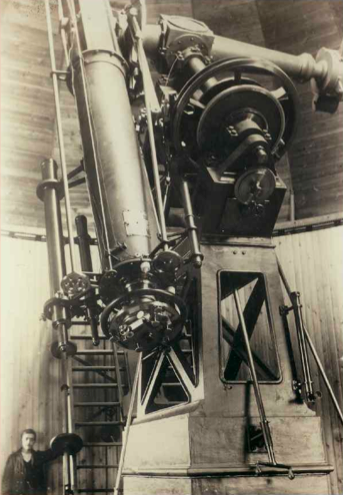
Refracting telescope of the observatory at Hem

The son of a wealthy Belgian textile industrialist, Robert Jonckhèere developed early in life an enthusiasm for astronomy. At age 12, he began to travel in England to learn the language and the textile industry. He attended secondary school at the lycée of Tourcoing and attended college at Notre Dame des Victoires de Roubaix. With his family fortune, he built a private observatory on the roof of the family home in 1905 and became a member of l'société astronomique de France. In 1907, he found a site for a new observatory on a hill 20 meters above the surrounding land, which is now in the city of Hem near Lille. Construction started in December 1907 and ended with the installation of the telescope under the dome in 1909.

=== Observatory at Hem ===
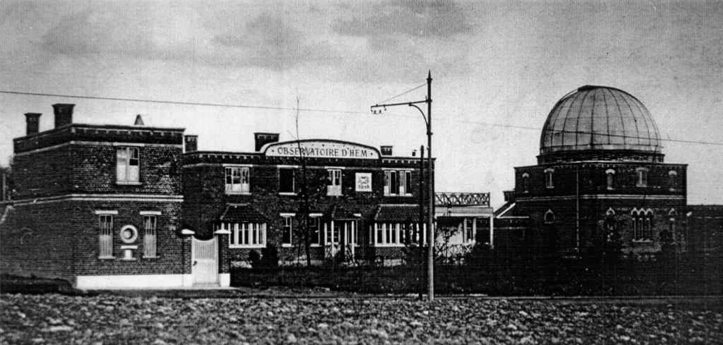
Observatory at Hem around 1909

Jonckhèere's observatory was not totally devoted to astronomy. The building complex had several offices, a residential house, a library, and a weather station.

=== Exile and return ===
During World War I, Robert Jonckhèere with his wife and children took refuge in England. During this period, the Royal Observatory, Greenwich allowed him to continue his study of double stars and published a catalogue presenting his results. For this catalogue, l'Académie des Sciences awarded him the Prix Lalande for 1917. In order to support his family, Jonckheere worked in the optical department of the Royal Arsenal in Woolwich. After the end of the war, he returned to France to find the family business in ruins. In 1920, he took over the business from his father but the 1920s were bad times for the business and the observatory. In 1929, Jonckhèere sold the telescope and equipment to the University of Lille for use by the Observatory of Lille.

=== Professional career ===
In spite of his achievements, Jonckhèere was unable to obtain employment as a researcher at the Observatory of Lille. In 1929, having sold land and building of his old installation at Hem, he left for Marseille.

At Marseille, Robert Jonckhèere was allowed to do research by the staff at the Observatory of Marseille but he had to do various odd jobs for a living. It was not until 1942 that he passed the entrance examination for the CNRS, enabling him to have the title Maître de Recherche and employment as a professional astronomer at the Observatory of Marseille. He continued his discoveries of double stars by using the telescope of Léon Foucault with its 80 centimeter mirror. Jonckhèere received the Prix Becquerel of l'Académie des Sciences in 1943.

He became chief editor of the Journal des Observateurs, a journal which published French astronomical research. He retired in 1962.

== Selected publications ==
- Jonckheere R. (1911) Stars, double and multiple, Cent nouvelles étoiles doubles. Monthly Notices of the Royal Astronomical Society, 71, 750 (abstract @ The Smithsonian/NASA Astrophysics Data System)
- Jonckheere R (1911) Stars, Double and multiple, Mesures d'étoiles doubles à l'Observatoire de Lille. Monthly Notices of the Royal Astronomical Society, 72, 156 (with The SAO/NASA Astrophysics Data System)
- Jonckheere R. (1912) Stars, Double and multiple, Nouvelles étoiles doubles. Monthly Notices of the Royal Astronomical Society, 72, 188 (SAO/NASA Astrophysics Data System ou ADS)
- Jonckheere R (1944) Sur les Catalogues d'Etoiles doubles et en particulier sur celui de RG Aitken. Journal des Observateurs, 27, 73 (with SAO/NASA Astrophysics Data System (ADS))

== Sources ==
- Thorel JC (1999) Robert Jonckheere, un Roubaisien astronome à Hem, l'Observatoire de Hem puis de Lille ou Une passion pour les étoiles doubles
- Thorel JC (2005) Robert jonckheere and double stars (Robert jonckheere et les étoiles doubles. qu'en est-il des mesures?), Observations et Travaux, 61, pages 26–33
- Thorel JC (2009). Le ciel d'une vie: Robert Jonckheere. Éditions Le Temps Présent. ISBN 978-2351850398.
