= Goodman and Kruskal's lambda =

Statistical measure of association for crosstabs

In probability theory and statistics, Goodman and Kruskal's lambda ($\lambda$) is a measure of proportional reduction in error in cross tabulation analysis. For any sample with a nominal independent variable and dependent variable (or ones that can be treated nominally), it indicates the extent to which the modal categories and frequencies for each value of the independent variable differ from the overall modal category and frequency, i.e., for all values of the independent variable together. $\lambda$ is defined by the equation

$$\lambda = \frac{\varepsilon_1 - \varepsilon_2}{\varepsilon_1}.$$

where

$\varepsilon_1$ is the overall non-modal frequency, and
$\varepsilon_2$ is the sum of the non-modal frequencies for each value of the independent variable.

Values for lambda range from zero (no association between independent and dependent variables) to one (perfect association).

== Weaknesses ==
Although Goodman and Kruskal's lambda is a simple way to assess the association between variables, it yields a value of 0 (no association) whenever two variables are in accord—that is, when the modal category is the same for all values of the independent variable, even if the modal frequencies or percentages vary. As an example, consider the table below, which describes a fictitious sample of 350 individuals, categorized by relationship status and blood pressure. Assume that the relationship status is the independent variable, the blood pressure is the dependent variable, i.e., the question asked is "can the blood pressure be predicted better if the relationship status is known?"

Relationship Status and Blood Pressure (fictitious)
		Relationship Status		Total
		Unmarried	Married	Total
Blood Pressure	Normal	80% (120)	51% (102)	63.4% (222)
Blood Pressure	High	20% (30)	49% (98)	36.6% (128)
Total		42.9% (150)	57.1% (200)	100% (350)

For this sample,

$$\lambda = \frac{128 - (30 + 98)}{128} = 0$$

The reason is that the predicted nominal blood pressure is actually "Normal" in both columns (both upper numbers are higher than the corresponding lower number). Thus, considering the relationship status will not change the prediction that people have a normal blood pressure, even though the data indicate that being married increases the probability of high blood pressure.

If the question is changed, e.g. by asking "What is the predicted relationship status based on blood pressure?," $\lambda$ will have a non-zero value.

That is:

$\lambda = \frac{150 - (30 + 102)}{150} = 0.12$

== See also ==
- Proportional reduction in loss
- Goodman and Kruskal's gamma
