= Neményi =

Neményi or Nemenyi is a surname. Notable people with the surname include:

- Paul Neményi (1895–1952), Hungarian mathematician and physicist
- Peter Nemenyi (1927–2002), American mathematician
- Vojtech Neményi (1899–1945), Slovak water polo player
