= Frank Wilcoxon =

Irish-American chemist and statistician

- Born: 2 September 1892; County Cork, Ireland
- Died: 18 November 1965 (aged 73); Tallahassee, Florida, US
- Education: Cornell University; Rutgers University
- Known for: Wilcoxon signed-rank test
- Scientific career
- Fields: Chemistry; Statistics
- Workplaces: Boyce Thompson Institute; Atlas Powder Company; American Cyanamid Company

Frank Wilcoxon (2 September 1892 – 18 November 1965) was a chemist and statistician, known for the development of several statistical tests.

== Education and career ==
Frank Wilcoxon was born to American parents on September 2nd 1892 in County Cork, Ireland. He grew up in Catskill, New York, but received part of his education in England. In 1917, he graduated from Pennsylvania Military College with a B.Sc. After the First World War, he entered graduate studies, first at Rutgers University, where he was awarded an M.S. in chemistry in 1921, and then at Cornell University, where he obtained a Phd in physical chemistry in 1924.

Wilcoxon entered a research career, working at the Boyce Thompson Institute for Plant Research from 1925 to 1941. He then moved to the Atlas Powder Company, where he designed and directed the Control Laboratory, before joining the American Cyanamid Company in 1943. During this time, he developed an interest in inferential statistics through the study of Ronald Fisher's 1925 text, Statistical Methods for Research Workers. He retired in 1957 and died on 18 November 1965.

== Research ==
Over his career, Wilcoxon published over 70 papers. His best-known paper contained the two new statistical tests that still bear his name, the Wilcoxon rank-sum test and the Wilcoxon signed-rank test. These are non-parametric alternatives to the unpaired and paired Student's t-tests, respectively.
