= Wade Deacon High School =

Location
- Birchfield Road; Widnes, Cheshire, WA8 7TD; England; 53.3752°N 2.7349°W

Information
- Type: Academy
- Motto: Latin: Fervet opus, lit. 'The work glows'
- Established: 1507
- Trust: Wade Deacon Trust
- Department for Education URN: 139368 Tables
- Ofsted: Reports
- Lead Principal: Brendan Hesketh
- Gender: Coeducational
- Age: 11 to 16
- Enrolment: 1,594 as of January 2024
- Capacity: 1,600
- Website: wadedeacon.co.uk

Wade Deacon High School is a coeducational secondary school with academy status in Widnes, Cheshire, England.

== History ==
Wade Deacon High School traces its origins to a local grammar school tradition in Widnes, with some accounts dating these roots to 1507.

A new main school building opened in 1931 as Wade Deacon Grammar School, and the school was named in honor of Sir Henry Wade Deacon (1852–1932), a Widnes industrialist associated with local education governance. Sir Henry Wade Deacon served as Chairman of Lancashire County Council (1927–1931).

=== Comprehensive ===
It became the Wade Deacon High School in September 1974 for ages 11–16. The headmaster, Ernest High Smith, came directly from the Kingsway County Secondary School, a secondary modern school on Kingsway, which formed the comprehensive with both grammar schools. He left in December 1978. Either Widnes VI Form College or Halton FE College would host the A levels. In April 1998, it was administered by Halton borough.

=== Fairfield High School Closure and Modernisation ===
In August 2010, the nearby Fairfield High School, Widnes closed due to a decreasing number of student admissions. Current students were merged into Wade Deacon's student body. To deal with the increased number of enrolled students, the school received a £25m refurbishment, with significant expansions made to the original 1931 building. During the renovations, pupils were taught at various sites across Widnes. The remodelling was finished by late 2013, with an opening ceremony on 11 December 2013.

=== Academy ===
The school converted to academy status on 1 March 2013.

== Admissions ==
As of February 2026, Wade Deacon has a Public Admissions Number of 350 per year and is oversubscribed.

== Notable former pupils ==
- Alan Bleasdale, playwright (1957–1964)
- James Durbin, Professor of Statistics from 1961-1988 at the London School of Economics, and President from 1986-7 of the Royal Statistical Society and from 1983-5 of the International Statistical Institute, and who invented the Durbin test (1934–41)
- Anthony Gordon, footballer
- Fred Lawless, writer and producer for Brookside
- Gordon Oakes, local Labour MP for Halton from 1983–97 and for Widnes from 1971–83
- Steve Platt, journalist
- Sir Ken Robinson, author (1963–1968)
- Stephen Myler, professional rugby union player, Northampton Saints and England
- Rachel McDowall, film actress
- Liam Walsh, footballer, Everton and Luton Town (born 1997)
