= Cochran's Q test =

Statistical test

Cochran's $Q$ test is a non-parametric statistical test to verify whether k treatments have identical effects in the analysis of two-way randomized block designs wherein the response variable is binary. It is named after William Gemmell Cochran. Cochran's Q test should not be confused with Cochran's C test, which is a variance outlier test. Put in simple technical terms, Cochran's Q test requires that there only be a binary response (e.g. success/failure or 1/0) and that there be more than two groups of the same size. The test assesses whether the proportion of successes is the same between groups. Often it is used to assess if different observers of the same phenomenon have consistent results (interobserver variability).

== Background ==
Cochran's Q test assumes that there are k > 2 experimental treatments and that the observations are arranged in b blocks; that is,

	Treatment 1	Treatment 2	$\cdots$	Treatment k
Block 1	X_{11}	X_{12}	$\cdots$	X_{1k}
Block 2	X_{21}	X_{22}	$\cdots$	X_{2k}
Block 3	X_{31}	X_{32}	$\cdots$	X_{3k}
$\vdots$	$\vdots$	$\vdots$	$\ddots$	$\vdots$
Block b	X_{b1}	X_{b2}	$\cdots$	X_{bk}

The "blocks" here might be individual people or other organisms. For example, if b respondents in a survey had each been asked k Yes/No questions, the Q test could be used to test the null hypothesis that all questions were equally likely to elicit the answer "Yes".

== Description ==
Cochran's Q test is

Null hypothesis (H_{0}): the treatments are equally effective.
Alternative hypothesis (H_{a}): there is a difference in effectiveness between treatments.

The Cochran's Q test statistic is

$$T = k\left(k-1\right)\frac{\sum\limits_{j=1}^k \left(X_{\bullet j} - \frac{N}{k}\right)^2}{\sum\limits_{i=1}^b X_{i\bullet}\left(k-X_{i\bullet}\right)}$$

where

k is the number of treatments
X_{• j} is the column total for the j^{th} treatment
b is the number of blocks
X_{i •} is the row total for the i^{th} block
N is the grand total

== Critical region ==
For significance level α, the asymptotic critical region is

$$T > \chi^2_{1-\alpha,k-1}$$

where Χ^{2}_{1 − α,k − 1} is the (1 − α)-quantile of the chi-squared distribution with k − 1 degrees of freedom. The null hypothesis is rejected if the test statistic is in the critical region. If the Cochran test rejects the null hypothesis of equally effective treatments, pairwise multiple comparisons can be made by applying Cochran's Q test on the two treatments of interest.

The exact distribution of the T statistic may be computed for small samples. This allows obtaining an exact critical region. A first algorithm had been suggested in 1975 by Patil and a second one has been made available by Fahmy and Bellétoile in 2017.

== Assumptions ==
Cochran's Q test is based on the following assumptions:

1. If the large sample approximation is used (and not the exact distribution), b is required to be "large".
2. The blocks were randomly selected from the population of all possible blocks.
3. The outcomes of the treatments can be coded as binary responses (i.e., a "0" or "1") in a way that is common to all treatments within each block.

== Related tests ==
- The Friedman test or Durbin test can be used when the response is not binary but ordinal or continuous.
- When there are exactly two treatments the Cochran Q test is equivalent to McNemar's test, which is itself equivalent to a two-tailed sign test.
