= James Durbin =

British statistician and econometrician

Professor James Durbin
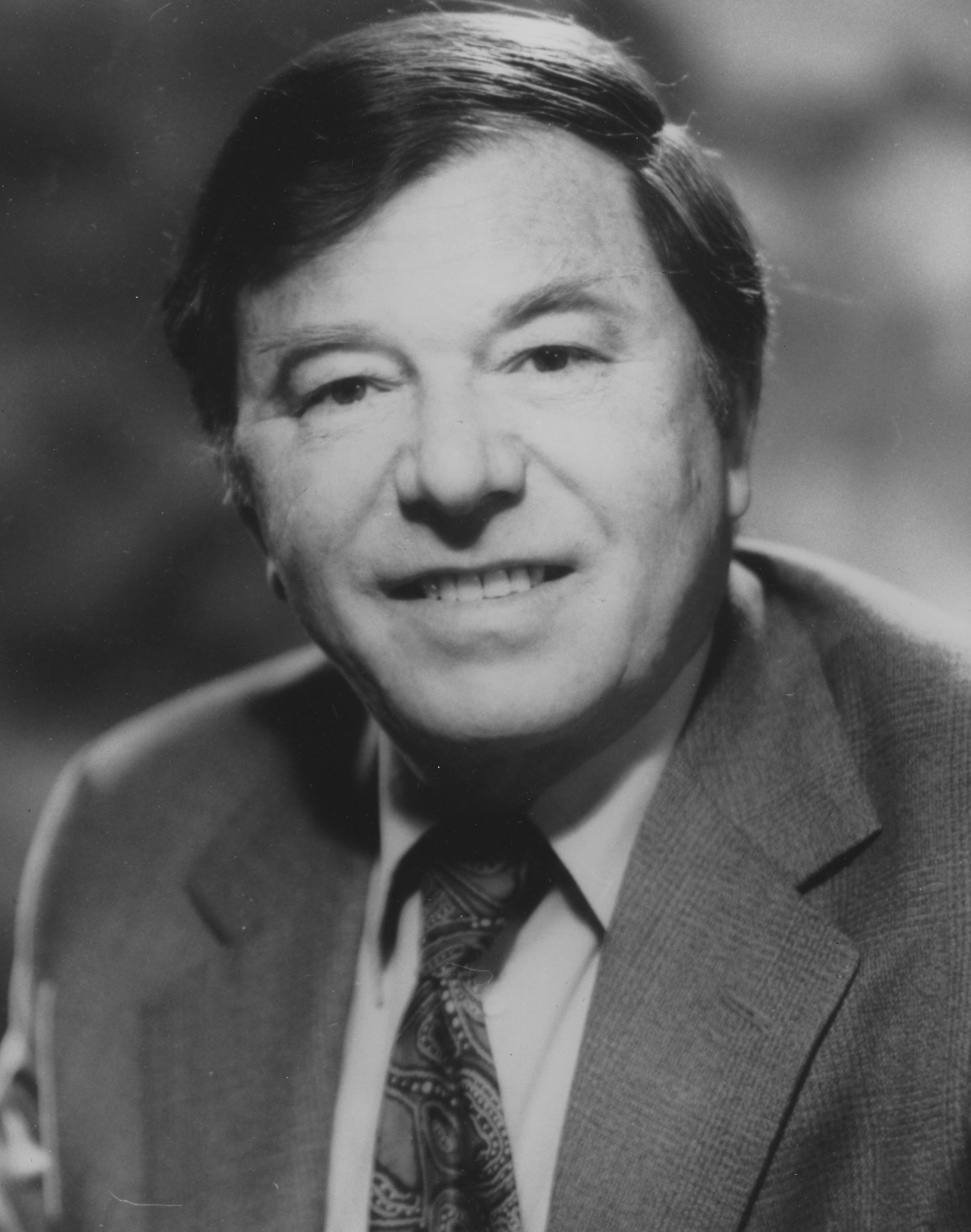
- Born: 30 June 1923; Widnes, England
- Died: 23 June 2012 (aged 88)
- Citizenship: United Kingdom
- Education: St John's College, Cambridge
- Known for: Time series analysis Serial correlation Durbin–Watson statistic Durbin test Levinson–Durbin algorithm
- Children: Richard Durbin
- Awards: Guy Medal (Bronze, 1966) (Silver, 1976) (Gold, 2008); Fellow of the British Academy
- Scientific career
- Fields: Statistics; Econometrics
- Workplaces: London School of Economics; University of Cambridge
- Academic advisors: Henry Daniels

James Durbin FBA (30 June 1923 – 23 June 2012) was a British statistician and econometrician, known particularly for his work on time series analysis and serial correlation.

== Education ==
The son of a greengrocer, Durbin was born in Widnes, where he attended the Wade Deacon Grammar School. He studied mathematics at St John's College, Cambridge, where his contemporaries included David Cox and Denis Sargan. After wartime service in the Army Operational Research Group, he worked as a statistician for two years with the British Boot, Shoe and Allied Trades Research Association and took a postgraduate diploma in mathematical statistics at Cambridge, supervised by Henry Daniels.

== Career ==
After two years at the department of applied economics in Cambridge, Durbin joined the London School of Economics in 1950 and was appointed professor of statistics in 1961, a post he held until his retirement in 1988.

== Awards and honours ==
He served as president of the International Statistical Institute from 1983 to 1985, and as president of the Royal Statistical Society (RSS) from 1986 to 1987. In 2008 he was awarded the highest distinction of the RSS, the Guy Medal in Gold (having previously been awarded both the Silver and Bronze medals). The citation read:

The Guy Medal in Gold is awarded to Professor James Durbin FBA for a life-time of highly influential contributions which have given him outstanding international recognition as a leader in our field, taking particular account of his pioneering work on testing for serial correlation in regression, on estimating equations, on Brownian motion and other processes crossing curved boundaries, on goodness of fit tests with estimated parameters, and on many aspects of time series analysis especially in areas relevant to econometrics, and also his remarkable service to the wider statistical profession on the international stage.

His last book, Time Series Analysis by State Space Methods, was published by Oxford University Press in May 2012. His last books were co-authored by Siem Jan Koopman of VU University Amsterdam. He died on 23 June 2012.
