= Nemenyi test =

Statistical technique

In statistics, the Nemenyi test is a post-hoc test intended to find the groups of data that differ after a global statistical test (such as the Friedman test) has rejected the null hypothesis that the performance of the comparisons on the groups of data is similar. The test makes pair-wise tests of performance.

The test is named after Peter Nemenyi.

The test is sometimes referred to as the "Nemenyi–Damico–Wolfe test", when regarding one-sided multiple comparisons of "treatments" versus "control", but it can also be referred to as the "Wilcoxon–Nemenyi–McDonald–Thompson test", when regarding two-sided multiple comparisons of "treatments" versus "treatments".

== See also ==
- Tukey's range test
