= Fairfield High School, Widnes =

Fairfield High School
- The school's demolition in September 2013

Location
- Peelhouse Lane; Widnes, Cheshire, WA8 6TE; England

Information
- Type: Comprehensive
- Motto: Animo Et Fide (Courage and Faith)
- Established: 1507
- Closed: 2010
- Ofsted: Reports
- Head of School: Nick Mcgee
- Gender: Coeducational
- Age: 11 to 16
- Capacity: 1200
- Houses: Bancroft, Hurst, Lovell, Radcliffe
- Colours: Blue, Yellow, Purple, Green

Fairfield High School was a co-educational secondary school in Widnes, Cheshire.

== Origins ==
Originally, Fairfield High School comprised two separate schools: Fairfield County Secondary School for Girls (founded in 1941) and the larger Fairfield County Secondary School for Boys founded in 1954, which took over the adjacent Farnworth Grammar School building. The school motto was Animo Et Fide which translates to Courage and Faith. All the buildings for these schools were demolished for housing in 2013.

== Uniform ==
From the inception of both schools, the uniform (for boys) was black trousers, white shirt, grey jumper, maroon and white striped tie with a black blazer and the Animo Et Fide badge. The girls had the same uniform, although in the 60s and 70s wore a grey skirt, and a maroon or grey jumper or cardigan; maroon blazer, maroon mackintosh; up until the mid 1990s, they were required to wear a skirt instead of trousers.

== Modern history ==
Following the introduction of the tripartite secondary education system under the 1944 Education, Widnes had an extremely selective secondary school system that persisted to the early 1970s, with barely 3 per cent of 11 year olds passing the 11 Plus exam to go to the Wade Deacon Grammar School. Meanwhile, as many as 50 per cent of the same cohort in London and the south attended grammar schools. The upshot was that many able students attended Fairfield and went on to achieve good results in their GCE Ordinary Level and Advanced Level exams.

The boys' school opened in 1954 with capacity for 1,200 students. R. "Cog" Roberts was recruited as headmaster from Kingsway Secondary Boys' School. In 1959, the boys' school had a 3-form entry of 11-12 year olds with 35+ students in each class. Many of the students came from Fairfield Infant and Fairfield Junior Schools located on the same road and amalgamated in 2014 to create Fairfield Primary School but many others joined the school from the Farnworth, Warrington Road, Simm's Cross, and West Bank junior schools.

Students could leave school at 15 until 1972, when the school leaving age was raised to 16. As head, Roberts was not only a strict disciplinarian but also keen monitor of the boys' academic and sports activities and progress, and dress. After the bell was rung by a monitor at the end of the school day, Roberts would stand at the intersection of the school's main corridors accosting random, sometimes anxious, students about their school work and academic progress.

Roberts retired in 1962 and was replaced by another strict disciplinarian, H. Gibson, who during his second year as head had to deal with an explosion in an annex to the school's chemistry lab in the recently built science block, which resulted in several boys being treated for several weeks for severe burns in Whiston Hospital. It was during H. Gibson's headship that the school's sixth form expanded offering A level courses in the sciences, French, History and English Literature so that students would not need to transfer to the Wade Deacon Grammar School. Students from Bankfield School, which did not offer A level teaching, also transferred to Fairfield. At a time when barely 5 per cent of 18 year olds attended university, several Fairfield students went on to university or teachers' training college. Gibson also initiated closer relations with the Girls School, including various social events.

At this time, footballer Ted McDougall moved to the school and in 1965 became an apprentice with Liverpool FC under manager Bill Shankly. Teachers at the school at that time included Messrs. Hesketh (deputy head and French), Fred Lott (Maths), Gerry Penketh (History), Bernie Farrell (English), and Ray French the rugby player and television commentator (who played rugby league and union for England, introduced rugby union to the school).

In 1974 the school was renamed Fairfield High School and became a fully integrated co-educational comprehensive school. In 1979, David Blacow became headteacher succeeding R. Walker.

=== 1981 arson attack ===
Two years later, on Saturday 5 September 1981, the school's science block was set on fire causing damage estimated to have cost £100,000. Five men were charged with arson: 17 year old Alan Nevitt, 17 year old Nigel Grant, 20 year old James Gorman, 19 year old Gary Davies, and 22 year old David Davies. Five appliances from Cheshire Fire and Rescue Service attended. The case went to Chester Court in December 1981.

On 16 December 1981, 32 year old Derek Rathbone, married with two sons, of Avondale Road in Widnes, was given three years. He had led a group of twenty youths to the school.

=== Redevelopment ===
In 1993, the upper school (on the former Boys' school site) was vastly extended and extensively rebuilt at a cost of £2.5 million, during Blacow's headship, and opened in September 1994. A 4-classroom building was further added on the lower school grounds (formerly the site of the Girls' school) in 1997.

In 1998, Keith Bates who replaced Blacow as headteacher introduced a house system that radically change the way the school operated. The four new houses were Radcliffe (Blue), Hurst (Yellow), Bancroft (Green) and Lovell (Purple). Each house was named after a local person of historical interest and importance to the town. Keith Bates would stay with the school until 2003 and was replaced by his deputy head Mr Jeff Hughes.

From 2004 Fairfield was designated as a specialist college in the performing arts and received extra government funding, including a complete refurbishment of the lower school building into a self-contained performing arts suite. It was also widely recognised for its sporting achievements, most notably when in 1999 Michael Owen, Kevin Keegan and Ant & Dec visited the school as part of a football programme.

== Decline and closure ==
By 2006, the school was receiving below average exam results and under threat, although in 2008 results were above the national average. By 2008 Jeff Hughes had left the school to join Penketh High School in Warrington and Mr Nick Mcgee took over as Head of School. Jeff Hughes would later go on to be an internet sensation when he recorded a video of him performing Gangnam Style.

Under the Government's Building Schools for the Future scheme, in 2009, Halton Borough Council announced that due to declining pupil numbers and falling exam results the school would close. By 2009, the school had attracted under 900 pupils. By the time the school closed in July 2010 with some pupils having transferred to Wade Deacon High School, pupil numbers were well under 600. At the same time, the school became part of a federation with Wade Deacon High School so as to enable both pupils and staff to transition more easily to Wade Deacon.

As part of the Building Schools for the Future scheme, Wade Deacon High School was all but demolished, only retaining the 1931 facade. During the building work the school was run from both the Wade Deacon and Fairfield sites until rebuilding work on Wade Deacon was completed. Wade Deacon paid tribute to Fairfield High School on page 7 of their Summer 2010 edition of their school newsletter.

The new Wade Deacon High School was opened in April 2013. This led to the Fairfield site being closed as a school for the final time in March 2013. Following the closure the Wade Deacon signage which had replaced the Fairfield signs was removed and the original Fairfield signs re-instated before demolition work began.

== Demolition ==
Demolition of Fairfield High School began in late August 2013, beginning with the mathematics block and the upper school gym, art and language classrooms. The demolition gradually moved forwards towards the front facade of the buildings meaning that on the outside at street level, not much could be seen until the front was finally demolished in order to reduce the impact on local residents. The lower school buildings were left until November before the roof was lifted from the main building and demolition began. The home economics classrooms which were left unused by Wade Deacon were partly demolished in November before being cleared in January 2014. The final building to be demolished was the newest building, which had only stood since 1997. The total cost of the demolition was around £430,000.

No school buildings remain on the site and the only structures left are the walls and electricity points, along with the school field and astro turf pitch. The majority of the school field is to be converted into a cemetery with the site of the school now being converted into a housing estate.

== Former headmasters ==
- Mr R Roberts (- 1962)
- Mr H Gibson (1962–67)
- Mr R Walker (1967 –79)
- Mr D Blacow (1979 - 1997)
- Mr K Bates (1997 - 2003)
- Mr J Hughes (2003 - 2008)
- Mr N McGee (2008 - 2010)

Former Deputy Headteachers

- Mr K Hughes (1950s-61)
- Mr E Hesketh (1962 - 1973)
- Miss M Ankers (1960s - 1980s)
- Mr D H Blacow (1973 - 1979)
- Mr L B Banks (1979 - 1983)
- Mr A K Irving (1980s)
- Mr J Hughes (1997 - 2003)
- Mr N McGee (2003 - 2008)

== Notable alumni ==
Notable ex pupils include:

- Ted McDougall, football player, formerly of Manchester United & Scotland
- Colin Cunningham, swimmer
- Melanie Chisholm, singer-songwriter, Mel C of Spice Girls broke both the boys' and girls' records for the high jump whilst at the school in the early 1990s. At the time of closure the record still stood.
- David Dawson, actor
- Bobbie Goulding, rugby player and coach
- Delme Herriman, professional basketball player
