= Median test =

Comparative statistical test

The median test (also Mood’s median-test, Westenberg-Mood median test or Brown-Mood median test) is a special case of Pearson's chi-squared test. It is a nonparametric test that tests the null hypothesis that the medians of the populations from which two or more samples drawn are identical. The data in each sample is assigned to two groups, one consisting of data whose values are higher than the median value in the two groups combined, and the other consisting of data whose values are at the median or below. A Pearson's chi-squared test is then used to determine whether the observed frequencies in each sample differ from expected frequencies derived from a distribution combining the two groups.

== Relation to other tests ==
The test has low power (efficiency) for moderate to large sample sizes. The Wilcoxon–Mann–Whitney U two-sample test or its generalisation for more samples, the Kruskal–Wallis test, can often be considered instead. The relevant aspect of the median test is that it only considers the position of each observation relative to the overall median, whereas the Wilcoxon–Mann–Whitney test takes the ranks of each observation into account. Thus the other mentioned tests are usually more powerful than the median test. Moreover, the median test can only be used for quantitative data.

However, the null hypothesis verified by the Wilcoxon–Mann–Whitney U (and so the Kruskal–Wallis test) is not only about medians. The test is sensitive also to differences in scale parameters and symmetry. As a consequence, if the Wilcoxon–Mann–Whitney U test rejects the null hypothesis, one cannot say that the rejection was caused only by the shift in medians. It is easy to prove by simulations, where samples with equal medians, yet different scales and shapes, lead the Wilcoxon–Mann–Whitney U test to fail as a test of medians.

However, although the alternative Kruskal-Wallis test does not assume normal distributions, it does assume that the variance is approximately equal across samples. Hence, in situations where that assumption does not hold, the median test is an appropriate test. Moreover, Siegel & Castellan (1988, p. 124) suggest that there is no alternative to the median test when one or more observations are "off the scale."

== See also ==
- Sign test – a paired alternative to the median test.
