= Sidney Siegel =

American psychologist (1916–1961)

Sidney Siegel (4 January 1916, New York City – 29 November 1961, Stanford, California) was an American psychologist who became especially well known for his work in popularizing non-parametric statistics for use in the behavioral sciences. He was a co-developer of the statistical test known as the Siegel–Tukey test.

In 1951 Siegel completed a B.A. in vocational arts at San Jose State College (now San Jose State University), then in 1953 a Ph.D. in Psychology at Stanford University. Except for a year spent at the Center for Advanced Study in the Behavioral Sciences at Stanford, he thereafter taught at Pennsylvania State University, until his death in November 1961 of a coronary thrombosis.

His parents, Jacob and Rebecca Siegel, were Jewish immigrants from Romania.

== See also ==
- Siegel–Tukey test
