= Paul Neményi =

Hungarian mathematician and physicist (1895–1952)

- Neményi, in a photo he sent to Theodore von Kármán, asking about a vacancy at Caltech
- Born: June 5, 1895; Fiume, Austro-Hungarian Empire (now Rijeka, Croatia)
- Died: March 1, 1952 (aged 56); Washington, D.C., U.S.
- Known for: "Inverse approach" in continuum mechanics
- Children: Peter Nemenyi; Bobby Fischer (reputed)

Paul Felix Neményi (Hungarian pronunciation: [ˈnɛmeːɲi]; June 5, 1895 – March 1, 1952) was a Hungarian mathematician and physicist who specialized in continuum mechanics. He was known for using what he called the inverse or semi-inverse approach, which applied vector field analysis, to obtain numerous exact solutions of the nonlinear equations of gas dynamics, many of them representing rotational flows of nonuniform total energy. His work applied geometrical solutions to fluid dynamics. In continuum mechanics, "Neményi's theorem" proves that, given any net of isothermal curves, there exists a five parameter family of plane stress systems for which these curves are stress trajectories.

Neményi's five constant theory for the determination of stress trajectories in plane elastic systems was subsequently proven by later mathematicians.

He was the father of the statistician Peter Nemenyi and the putative father of former World Chess Champion Bobby Fischer.

== Biography ==
=== Family ===
Neményi was born to a wealthy Hungarian-Jewish family on June 5, 1895, in Fiume (Rijeka) in the Kingdom of Hungary. His grandfather was Siegmund Neumann who magyarized his family to Neményi in 1871 and part of the family became Christians. Pauls father Dezső Neményi was one of the directors at Rijeka Refinery (now INA d.d.). His mother was Julianna Goldberger de Buda (or Buday= von Buda), born 1868 in Budapest, as at least, the fifth consecutive generation Goldberger to do so. Neményi attended elementary and high school in Fiume (Rijeka). He graduated from high school in Budapest. Neményi's uncle was Dr. Ambrus Neményi, born in Pécel, c. 20 km east of Budapest. Paul Neményi's aunt was Berta Koppély (whose parents were Adolf Koppély (1809–1883) and Rózsa von Hatvany-Deutsch). His family's art collection included works by Klimt, Kandinsky and Matisse.

Hungary at the time was producing a generation of geniuses in the exact sciences, who would be collectively known as Martians, that included Theodore von Kármán (b. 1881), George de Hevesy (b. 1885), Leó Szilárd (b. 1898), Dennis Gabor (b. 1900), Eugene Wigner (b. 1902), John von Neumann (b. 1903), Edward Teller (b. 1908), and Paul Erdős (b. 1913).

== Career ==
=== Mathematical career ===
A child prodigy in mathematics, at the age of 17, Neményi won the Hungarian national mathematics competition. Neményi obtained his doctorate in mathematics in Berlin in 1922 and was appointed a lecturer in fluid dynamics at the Technische Hochschule in Charlottenburg (now Technische Universität Berlin). In the early 1930s, he published a textbook on mathematical mechanics that became required reading in German universities. Stripped of his position when the Nazis came to power, he also had to leave Hungary where anti-Semitic laws had been enacted, and found work for a time in Copenhagen.

In Germany, Neményi belonged to a Socialist party called the ISK, which believed that truth could be arrived at through neo-Kantian Socratic principles. He was an animal-rights supporter and refused to wear anything made of wool. In 1930, Neményi entrusted his 3 year old first son, Peter Nemenyi, to be looked after by the socialist vegetarian community, visiting him once a year.

He arrived in the US at the outbreak of World War II. He briefly held a number of teaching positions in succession and took part in hydraulic research at the State University of Iowa. In 1941 he was appointed instructor at the University of Colorado (other sources claim Colorado State University), and in 1944 at the State College of Washington.

Theodore von Kármán wrote of Neményi: "When he came to this country, he went to scientific meetings in an open shirt without a tie and was very much disappointed as I advised him to dress as anyone else. He told me that he thought this was a country of freedom, and the man is only judged according to his internal values and not his external appearance."

In 1947 Neményi was appointed a physicist with the Naval Ordnance Laboratory, White Oak, Maryland. He was head of the Theoretical Mechanics Section at the laboratory and one of the country's principal authorities on elasticity and fluid dynamics. At the US Navy Research Laboratory, Neményi became mentor to Jerald Ericksen, where he put Ericksen to work on the study of water bells.

Neményi pioneered what he called the inverse or semi-inverse approach, which applied vector field analysis, to obtain numerous exact solutions of the nonlinear equations of gas dynamics, many of them representing rotational flows of nonuniform total energy. In continuum mechanics, "Neményi's theorem" proves that, given any net of isothermal curves, there exists a five parameter family of plane stress systems for which these curves are stress trajectories.

In his exposition, The Main Concepts and Ideas of Fluid Dynamics in their Historical Development, Neményi was highly critical of Isaac Newton's inadequate understanding of fluid dynamics. I. Bernard Cohen argues that Neményi pays insufficient attention to Newton's empirical experiments. However, Cohen notes that Neményi provides the "most thorough and incisive analyses in print of Newton's work on fluids, written by an obvious master of science. For example, Neményi is the only author I have encountered who has shown the weakness of Newton's "proof" at the end of Book 2, that vortices contradict the laws of astronomy.

Neményi's scientific knowledge extended well beyond the subjects of his researches. He has been described as having "extreme[ly] versatile interests and erudition". Neményi's interest and ability encompassed several nonscientific fields. He collected children's art and sometimes lectured upon it. In 1951, he published a critique of the entire Encyclopædia Britannica, and suggested improvements for such diverse sections as psychology and psychoanalysis.

Neményi was also deeply interested in the philosophy of mathematics and mathematical education. Clifford Truesdell writes that it was Neményi who first taught him "that mechanics was something deep and beautiful, beyond the ken of schools of "applied mathematics" and "applied mechanics"".

Paul Neményi died on March 1, 1952, at the age of 56. He was survived officially by one son: Peter Nemenyi, then a student of mathematics at Princeton University.

== Supposed fatherhood of Bobby Fischer ==
In 2002 Neményi was identified as the probable biological father of world chess champion Bobby Fischer, not the man named on Fischer's birth certificate (Hans Gerhardt Fischer). Additional details on their relationship were reported in 2009.

In A Psychobiography of Bobby Fischer, Joseph G. Ponterotto enumerates nine clusters of evidence that indicate that Neményi was Bobby Fischer's father:

1. Regina Fischer and Hans Gerhardt Fischer had no confirmed contact after 1939.
2. Paul Neményi was in contact with Regina Fischer both before and after Bobby's birth, and occasionally came to visit Bobby.
3. Regina told Jewish Family Services that she gave birth to a boy by Neményi in 1943. Neményi told a social worker that they had agreed to put the child up for adoption, but that Regina had later refused.
4. Paul Neményi used Jewish Family Services to deliver money to Regina and Bobby and told the agency that he was concerned for Bobby's welfare.
5. In letter to the psychiatrist Harold Kline on March 13, 1952, Peter Nemenyi wrote, "I take it you know that Paul was Bobby Fischer’s father."
6. After Paul Neményi's death, Regina Fischer wrote to Peter Nemenyi to ask whether Paul had left any money for Bobby.
7. In a letter to Allen W. Dulles on May 22, 1959, J. Edgar Hoover wrote, "Investigation has established that Robert James Fischer’s father was one Paul Felix Nemenyi."
8. A court document signed by Regina Fischer following Paul Neményi's death states that Bobby "was born to the decedent out of wedlock".
9. Paul Neményi and Bobby Fischer physically resembled each other.

== Selected list of publications ==
- Ludin, Adolf; Neményi, Paul (1930). Die nordischen Wasserkräfte: Ausbau und wirtschaftliche Ausnutzung. Berlin: Julius Springer.
- Neményi, Paul (1933). Wasserbauliche Strömungslehre. Barth Verlag.
- Neményi, Paul; Netser, Bennie N. (1940). "Relation of the Statistical Theory of Turbulence to Hydraulics". Proceedings of the American Society of Civil Engineers. 66: 967–979.
- Neményi, Paul; Prim, R. (1948). "Some Geometric Properties of Plane Gas Flow". Journal of Mathematics and Physics. 27 (2): 130–135. doi:10.1002/sapm1948271130.
- Neményi, Paul (1962). "The Main Concepts and Ideas of Fluid Dynamics in their Historical Development". Archive for History of Exact Sciences. 2: 52–86. doi:10.1007/BF00325161. S2CID 120618333. Posthumous publication, edited by Clifford Truesdell.

== Obituaries ==
- Truesdell, Clifford (1952). "Paul Felix Neményi: 1895–1952". Science. 116 (3009): 215–216. Bibcode:1952Sci...116..215T. doi:10.1126/science.116.3009.215. JSTOR 1680060. PMID 17770928.
- Truesdell, Clifford (1953). "Obituaries". Journal of the Washington Academy of Sciences. 43 (2): 62–64.
