= Peter Nemenyi =

American mathematician, half-brother of Bobby Fischer (1927–2002)

Peter Björn Nemenyi (April 14, 1927 – May 20, 2002) was an American mathematician, who worked in statistics and probability theory. He taught mathematics at a number of American colleges and universities, including Hunter College, Tougaloo College, Oberlin College, University of North Carolina at Chapel Hill, Virginia State College and the University of Wisconsin–Madison. Several statistical tests, for example the Nemenyi test, bear his name. He was also a prominent civil-rights activist. He was the son of Paul Neményi an eminent fluid and engineering mechanics expert of the twentieth century. His mother was Aranka Heller, poet and scholar, daughter of Bernat Heller, a renowned 'Aggadist, Islamic scholar and folklorist.

== Life ==
Peter Nemenyi was born in Berlin, to which his parents had fled after anti-Jewish laws had been enacted in Hungary. His parents separated, and he was brought up in a socialist boarding school operated by the ISK, a German socialist party founded by Leonard Nelson. After the rise of Nazism, the party was banned in Germany and its property was seized. The school frequently relocated to different European countries, as Nazi strength grew. During the Second World War the adults in the party were interned on the Isle of Man and Nemenyi lived in a number of foster homes and youth homes.

After the war, Peter moved to the United States to live with his father in Hanford, Washington.

He was drafted almost immediately and served near Trieste. After military service, he attended Black Mountain College under the G.I. Bill. He received his Ph.D. from Princeton University with a thesis on Distribution-Free Multiple Comparisons advised by John Wilder Tukey. Several statistical tests, most notably the Nemenyi test bear his name.

Peter Nemenyi is also known as a civil-rights activist in the Deep South. He also worked for the revolutionary government in Nicaragua, which affected his health. He was an active member of the Congress of Racial Equality in New York, working in Mississippi in 1962, in Jackson, and 1964–65 in Laurel.

Nemenyi's father, Paul Nemenyi, was probably the father of 1972 World Chess Champion Bobby Fischer. Peter Nemenyi was aware of this, and made efforts to care for the young Fischer after Paul Nemenyi died in 1952.

== Publications ==
- Peter Nemenyi: Distribution-free multiple comparisons, Doctoral Thesis, Princeton University, 1963.
- Peter Nemenyi and Sylvia K. Dixon: Statistics from Scratch. Holden-Day Series in Probability and Statistics, 1977. ISBN 978-0-8162-6384-4
