= Biserial correlation =

The biserial correlation coefficient is a measure of association between a continuous variable and a binary (dichotomous) variable. It is used when the binary variable is assumed to have been created by dividing an underlying continuous latent variable into two categories. The underlying variable is assumed to follow a normal distribution.

For example, an examination result recorded as "pass" or "fail" may be treated as a dichotomized version of an underlying continuous variable representing a student's level of knowledge.

== Theoretical assumptions ==
The proper application and interpretation of the biserial correlation coefficient require three main assumptions:

1. The observed dichotomous variable reflects an underlying hypothetical continuous variable.

2. The distribution of this latent variable in the population is normal.

3. The regression of the continuous variable on the dichotomized latent variable is linear.

== Formula ==
The biserial correlation coefficient can be calculated using the following formula:

$$r_b = \left(\frac{\bar{x}_{1}-\bar{x}_0}{s_x}\right)
\left(\frac{n_1 n_0}{n^2\phi\left(\Phi^{-1}\left(n_1/n\right)\right)}\right)
{\sqrt{\frac{n}{n-1}}}$$,

where $\bar{x}_1$ is the mean value of the quantitative variable in the first group defined by the dichotomous variable, $\bar{x}_0$ is the mean value in the second group, $s_x$ is the sample standard deviation of the quantitative variable calculated with Bessel's correction (using $n-1$ in the denominator), $n_1$ and $n_0$ are the sample sizes of the first and second groups respectively, $n$ is the total sample size, $\phi$ is the probability density function of the standard normal distribution, and $\Phi^{-1}$ is the inverse cumulative distribution function of the standard normal distribution.

An alternative but equivalent formula is:

$$r_b = \left(\frac{\bar{x}_{1}-\bar{x}}{\widehat{\sigma}_x
}\right)\left(\frac{n_1/n}{\phi\left(\Phi^{-1}\left(n_1/n\right)\right)}\right) =
\left(\frac{\bar{x}_1-\bar{x}}{s_x
}\right)\left(\frac{n_1/n}{\phi\left(\Phi^{-1}\left(n_1/n\right)\right)}\right)
{\sqrt{\frac{n}{n-1}}}$$,

where $\bar{x}$ is the mean value of the quantitative variable in the entire sample (both groups combined), and $\widehat{\sigma}_x$ is the standard deviation of the quantitative variable calculated without Bessel's correction:

$$\widehat{\sigma}_x = \sqrt{\frac {\sum_i(x_i-\bar{x})^2}{n}} = s_x \sqrt{\frac{n-1}{n}}$$.

== Interpretation and limitations ==
When the theoretical assumptions are satisfied, the biserial correlation coefficient is a consistent estimator of the Pearson correlation coefficient between the quantitative variable and the latent (dichotomized) variable in the population.

However, it has an important limitation: if the assumption of normality of the quantitative (continuous) variable is violated (for example, if its distribution is highly skewed), the calculated value of the coefficient may exceed 1. Even when all theoretical assumptions are satisfied, sampling variability can also produce values exceeding 1 when the true correlation is close to ±1, since the estimator's asymptotic efficiency approaches zero in that region.

In cases of substantial non-normality or when values greater than one are obtained, the literature recommends the use of alternative measures.

== Generalization ==
The direct generalization of biserial correlation to variables with more than two categories (e.g., Likert scale responses) is the polyserial correlation coefficient. It assumes that the ordinal variable with multiple categories also arises from the discretization of an underlying normally distributed latent variable.

== See also ==
- Tetrachoric correlation
- Polychoric correlation
- Point-biserial correlation coefficient
