= Correlation coefficient =

Numerical measure of a statistical relationship between variables

A correlation coefficient is a numerical measure of some type of linear correlation, meaning a linear function between two variables. (Note: Correlation coefficient: A statistic used to show how the scores from one measure relate to scores on a second measure for the same group of individuals. A high value (approaching +1.00) is a strong direct relationship, values near 0.50 are considered moderate and values below 0.30 are considered to show weak relationship. A low negative value (approaching -1.00) is similarly a strong inverse relationship, and values near 0.00 indicate little, if any, relationship.) The variables may be two columns of a given data set of observations, often called a sample, or two components of a multivariate random variable with a known distribution.

Several types of correlation coefficient exist, each with their own definition and range of usability and characteristics. They all assume values in the range from −1 to +1, where ±1 indicates the strongest possible correlation and 0 indicates no correlation. As tools of analysis, correlation coefficients present certain problems, including the propensity of some types to be distorted by outliers and the possibility of incorrectly being used to infer a causal relationship between the variables (for more, see Correlation does not imply causation).

== Types ==
There are several different measures for the degree of correlation in data, depending on the kind of data: principally, whether the data is a measurement, ordinal, or categorical.

=== Pearson ===
The Pearson product-moment correlation coefficient, also known as r, R, or Pearson's r, is a measure of the strength and direction of the linear relationship between two variables that is defined as the covariance of the variables divided by the product of their standard deviations. This is the best-known and most commonly used type of correlation coefficient. When the term "correlation coefficient" is used without further qualification, it usually refers to the Pearson product-moment correlation coefficient.

$r = \frac{\operatorname{cov}(X,Y)}{\sigma_X \sigma_Y}$

where r is the Pearson correlation coefficient; cov(X,Y) denotes the covariance between variables X and Y; and $\sigma_X$ and $\sigma_Y$ denote the standard deviations of X and Y, respectively.

$r = \frac{n\sum xy - (\sum x)(\sum y)}{\sqrt{[n\sum x^2 - (\sum x)^2][n\sum y^2 - (\sum y)^2]}}$

where n is the number of data pairs; $\sum xy$ is the sum of the product of paired scores;$\sum x$ and $\sum y$ are the sums of x-scores and y-scores;$\sum x^2$and $\sum y^2$ are the sums of squared x-scores and squared y-scores.

=== Intra-class ===
Intraclass correlation (ICC) is a descriptive statistic that can be used when quantitative measurements are made on units that are organized into groups; it describes how strongly units in the same group resemble each other.

=== Rank ===
Rank correlation is a measure of the relationship between the rankings of two variables, or two rankings of the same variable:

- Spearman's rank correlation coefficient is a measure of how well the relationship between two variables can be described by a monotonic function.
- The Kendall tau rank correlation coefficient is a measure of the portion of ranks that match between two data sets.
- Goodman and Kruskal's gamma is a measure of the strength of association of the cross tabulated data when both variables are measured at the ordinal level.

=== Tetrachoric and polychoric ===
The polychoric correlation coefficient measures the association between two ordered-categorical variables. It's technically defined as the estimate of the Pearson correlation coefficient one would obtain if:

1. The two variables were measured on a continuous scale, instead of as ordered-category variables.
2. The two continuous variables followed a bivariate normal distribution.

When both variables are dichotomous instead of ordered-categorical, the polychoric correlation coefficient is called the tetrachoric correlation coefficient.

=== Interpreting correlation coefficient values ===
The correlation between two variables have different associations that are measured in values such as r or R. Correlation values range from −1 to +1, where ±1 indicates the strongest possible correlation and 0 indicates no correlation between variables.

r or R	r or R	Strength or weakness of association between variables
+0.8 to +1.0	-1.0 to -0.8	Perfect or very strong association
+0.6 to +0.8	-0.8 to -0.6	Strong association
+0.4 to +0.6	-0.6 to -0.4	Moderate association
+0.2 to +0.4	-0.4 to -0.2	Weak association
+0.0 to 0.2	-0.2 to 0.0	Very weak or no association

== See also ==
- Correlation disattenuation
- Coefficient of determination
- Correlation and dependence
- Correlation ratio
- Distance correlation
- Goodness of fit, any of several measures that measure how well a statistical model fits observations by summarizing the discrepancy between observed values and the values expected under the model
- Multiple correlation
- Partial correlation
