= Negative relationship =

Higher values of one variable leading to lower values of the other

When t > π /2 or t < – π /2, then cos(t) < 0.

In statistics, there is a negative relationship or inverse relationship between two variables if higher values of one variable tend to be associated with lower values of the other. A negative relationship between two variables usually implies that the correlation between them is negative, or — what is in some contexts equivalent — that the slope in a corresponding graph is negative. A negative correlation between variables is also called inverse correlation.

Negative correlation can be seen geometrically when two normalized random vectors are viewed as points on a sphere, and the correlation between them is the cosine of the circular arc of separation of the points on a great circle of the sphere. When this arc is more than a quarter-circle (θ > π/2), then the cosine is negative. Diametrically opposed points represent a correlation of –1 = cos(π), called anti-correlation. Any two points not in the same hemisphere have negative correlation.

An example would be a negative cross-sectional relationship between illness and vaccination, if it is observed that where the incidence of one is higher than average, the incidence of the other tends to be lower than average. Similarly, there would be a negative temporal relationship between illness and vaccination if it is observed in one location that times with a higher-than-average incidence of one tend to coincide with a lower-than-average incidence of the other.

A particular inverse relationship is called inverse proportionality, and is given by $y = k/x$ where k > 0 is a constant. In a Cartesian plane this relationship is displayed as a hyperbola with y decreasing as x increases.

In finance, an inverse correlation between the returns on two different assets enhances the risk-reduction effect of diversifying by holding them both in the same portfolio.

== See also ==
- Diminishing returns
