= Iconography of correlations =

Data visualization technique

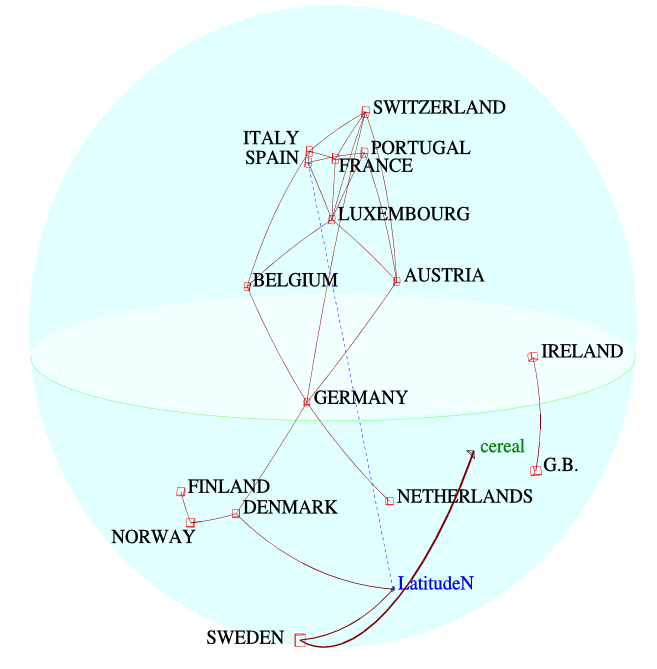
Representation of the proximity of food profiles in Europe.

In exploratory data analysis, the iconography of correlations, or representation of correlations, is a data visualization technique which replaces a numeric correlation matrix by its graphical projection onto a diagram. Correlations between variables are represented by solid lines (positive correlations) or dotted lines (negative correlations) plotted on the diagram, where shorter lengths or thicker lines (or both) represent greater projection components and thus greater degree of correlation.

== History ==
The idea of using graphical models to represent correlations has a notable application in genomic mapping, though the iconography of correlations is more general for not assuming the probability distribution, since it only relies on representing the correlation coefficients geometrically.

The iconography of correlations first dates to 1975, applied to marine geochemistry in a 1981 thesis, and later in a 1982 data analysis article. Afterwards, the method was applied widely in the aerospace industry but for about fifteen years manufacturers kept it fairly confidential; generally, they preferred not to broadcast useful techniques to their competitors.

In 1997 the first company was incorporated to distribute iconography of correlations software. Since then the topic of iconography of correlations has been incorporated into university courses, and typical topical articles' citation lists have rapidly and greatly expanded, particularly in the fields of medicine and mass spectrometry.

== See also ==
- Bayesian network – Probabilistic graphical representation of causal relationships
