= Interclass correlation =

In statistics, the interclass correlation (or interclass correlation coefficient) measures the relationship between two variables of different classes (types), such as the weights of 10-year-old sons and their 40-year-old fathers. Deviations for each variable are calculated from the mean of their respective classes – specifically, a son's weight minus the mean weight of all sons, or a father's weight minus the mean weight of all fathers.

The Pearson correlation coefficient is the most commonly used measure of interclass correlation.

The interclass correlation differs from intraclass correlation, which involves variables of the same class, such as the weights of women and their identical twins. In this case, deviations are measured from the mean of all members of the single class, such as all women within the set of identical twins.
