= Cophenetic =

In the clustering of biological information such as data from microarray experiments, the cophenetic similarity or cophenetic distance of two objects is a measure of how similar those two objects have to be in order to be grouped into the same cluster. The cophenetic distance between two objects is the height of the dendrogram where the two branches that include the two objects merge into a single branch. Outside the context of a dendrogram, it is the distance between the largest two clusters that contain the two objects individually when they are merged into a single cluster that contains both.

== See also ==
- Cophenetic correlation
