= Cophenetic correlation =

Statistical measure of a dendrogram's faithfulness to the data

In statistics, and especially in biostatistics, cophenetic correlation (more precisely, the cophenetic correlation coefficient) is a measure of how faithfully a dendrogram preserves the pairwise distances between the original unmodeled data points. Although it has been most widely applied in the field of biostatistics (typically to assess cluster-based models of DNA sequences, or other taxonomic models), it can also be used in other fields of inquiry where raw data tend to occur in clumps, or clusters. This coefficient has also been proposed for use as a test for nested clusters.

== Calculating the cophenetic correlation coefficient ==
Suppose that the original data {X_{i}} have been modeled using a cluster method to produce a dendrogram {T_{i}}; that is, a simplified model in which data that are "close" have been grouped into a hierarchical tree. Define the following distance measures.

- $x(i,j) = |X_i-X_j|$, the Euclidean distance between the ith and jth observations.
- $t(i,j)$, the dendrogrammatic distance between the model points $T_i$ and $T_j$. This distance is the height of the node at which these two points are first joined together.

Then, letting $\bar{x}$ be the average of the x(i, j), and letting $\bar{t}$ be the average of the t(i, j), the cophenetic correlation coefficient c is given by

$$c = \frac {\sum_{i<j} [x(i,j) - \bar{x}][t(i,j) - \bar{t}]}{\sqrt{\sum_{i<j}[x(i,j)-\bar{x}]^2 \sum_{i<j}[t(i,j)-\bar{t}]^2}}.$$

== Software implementation ==
It is possible to calculate the cophenetic correlation in R using the dendextend R package.

In Python, the SciPy package also has an implementation.

In MATLAB, the Statistic and Machine Learning toolbox contains an implementation.

== See also ==
- Cophenetic
