= Mean dependence =

In probability theory, a random variable $Y$ is said to be mean independent of random variable $X$ if and only if its conditional mean $E(Y \mid X = x)$ equals its (unconditional) mean $E(Y)$ for all $x$ such that the probability density/mass of $X$ at $x$, $f_X(x)$, is not zero. Otherwise, $Y$ is said to be mean dependent on $X$.

Stochastic independence implies mean independence, but the converse is not true.; moreover, mean independence implies uncorrelatedness while the converse is not true. Unlike stochastic independence and uncorrelatedness, mean independence is not symmetric: it is possible for $Y$ to be mean-independent of $X$ even though $X$ is mean-dependent on $Y$.

The concept of mean independence is often used in econometrics to have a middle ground between the strong assumption of independent random variables ($X_1 \perp X_2$) and the weak assumption of uncorrelated random variables $(\operatorname{Cov}(X_1, X_2) = 0).$
