= Surrogate data =

Time series data technique

Surrogate data, sometimes known as analogous data, usually refers to time series data that is produced using well-defined (linear) models like ARMA processes that reproduce various statistical properties like the autocorrelation structure of a measured data set. The resulting surrogate data can then for example be used for testing for non-linear structure in the empirical data; this is called surrogate data testing.

Surrogate or analogous data also refers to data used to supplement available data from which a mathematical model is built. Under this definition, it may be generated (i.e., synthetic data) or transformed from another source.

== Uses ==
Surrogate data is used in environmental and laboratory settings, when study data from one source is used in estimation of characteristics of another source. For example, it has been used to model population trends in animal species. It can also be used to model biodiversity, as it would be difficult to gather actual data on all species in a given area.

Surrogate data may be used in forecasting. Data from similar series may be pooled to improve forecast accuracy. Use of surrogate data may enable a model to account for patterns not seen in historical data.

Another use of surrogate data is to test models for non-linearity. The term surrogate data testing refers to algorithms used to analyze models in this way. These tests typically involve generating data, whereas surrogate data in general can be produced or gathered in many ways.

== Methods ==
One method of surrogate data is to find a source with similar conditions or parameters, and use those data in modeling. Another method is to focus on patterns of the underlying system, and to search for a similar pattern in related data sources (for example, patterns in other related species or environmental areas).

Rather than using existing data from a separate source, surrogate data may be generated through statistical processes, which may involve random data generation using constraints of the model or system.

== See also ==
- Bootstrapping (statistics)
- Data augmentation
- Jackknife resampling
- Synthetic data
