= Phillip Good =

Canadian-American mathematical statistician

Phillip I. Good Freygood (born in 1937) is a Canadian-American mathematical statistician. He was educated at McGill University and the University of California at Berkeley.

His chief contributions to statistics are in the area of small sample statistics, including a uniformly most powerful unbiased (UMPU) permutation test for Type I censored data, an exact test for comparing variances, and an exact test for cross-over designs.

== Selected books ==
- The A to Z of Error-Free Research, Chapman and Hall/CRC, 2012.
- A Practitioner's Guide to Resampling for Data Analysis, Data Mining, and Modeling, Chapman and Hall/CRC, 2011.
- Introduction to Statistics Using Resampling Methods and R/S-Plus. Wiley, 2005 (2nd edition, 2012).
- Introduction to Statistics Using Resampling Methods and Excel. Wiley, 2005.
- Common Errors in Statistics (and How to Avoid Them) (with J. Hardin), Wiley, 2003 (4th edition, 2012).
- Applying Statistics in the Courtroom: A New Approach for Attorneys and Expert Witnesses, Chapman Hall, London, 2001. ISBN 1-58488-271-9
- Resampling Methods, Birkhauser, Boston, 1999 (3rd edition, 2005).
- Permutation, Parametric and Bootstrap Tests of Hypotheses, Springer-Verlag, NY, 1994 (3rd edition, 2005).
