= Synthetic data =

Algorithmically generated data that have a similar distribution as sampled data

Synthetic data are artificially generated data not produced by real-world events. Typically created using algorithms, synthetic data can be deployed to validate mathematical models and to train machine learning models.

Data generated by a computer simulation can be seen as synthetic data. This encompasses most applications of physical modeling, such as music synthesizers or flight simulators. The output of such systems approximates the real thing, but is fully algorithmically generated.

Synthetic data is used in a variety of fields as a filter for information that would otherwise compromise the confidentiality of particular aspects of the data. In many sensitive applications, datasets theoretically exist but cannot be released to the general public; synthetic data sidesteps the privacy issues that arise from using real consumer information without permission or compensation.

== Usefulness ==
Synthetic data is generated to meet specific needs or certain conditions that may not be found in the original, real data. One of the hurdles in applying up-to-date machine learning approaches for complex scientific tasks is the scarcity of labeled data, a gap effectively bridged by the use of synthetic data, which closely replicates real experimental data. This can be useful when designing many systems, from simulations based on theoretical value, to database processors, etc. This helps detect and solve unexpected issues such as information processing limitations. Synthetic data are often generated to represent the authentic data and allows a baseline to be set. Another benefit of synthetic data is to protect the privacy and confidentiality of authentic data, while still allowing for use in testing systems.

Computer security experts claim generated synthetic data "... enables us to create realistic behavior profiles for users and attackers. The data is used to train the fraud detection system itself, thus creating the necessary adaptation of the system to a specific environment." In defense and military contexts, synthetic data is seen as a potentially valuable tool to develop and improve complex AI systems, particularly in contexts where high-quality real-world data is scarce. At the same time, synthetic data together with the testing approach can give the ability to model real-world scenarios.

== History ==
Scientific modelling of physical systems has a long history that runs concurrent with the history of physics. For example, research into synthesis of audio and voice can be traced back to the 1930s and before, driven forward by the developments of the telephone and audio recording technologies. Digitization gave rise to software synthesizers from the 1970s onwards.

In the context of privacy-preserving statistical analysis, in 1993, the idea of original fully synthetic data was created by Donald Rubin. Rubin originally designed this to synthesize the Decennial Census long form responses for the short form households. He then released samples that did not include any actual long form records - in this he preserved anonymity of the household. Later that year, the idea of original partially synthetic data was created by Little. Little used this idea to synthesize the sensitive values on the public use file.

A 1993 work fitted a statistical model to 60,000 MNIST digits, then it was used to generate over 1 million examples. Those were used to train a LeNet-4 to reach state of the art performance.

In 1994, Stephen Fienberg introduced 'critical refinement', in which a parametric posterior predictive distribution (instead of a Bayes bootstrap) is used to do the sampling. Later, other important contributors to the development of synthetic data generation were Trivellore Raghunathan, Jerry Reiter, Donald Rubin, John M. Abowd, and Jim Woodcock. Collectively they came up with a solution for how to treat partially synthetic data with missing data. Similarly, they developed the technique of Sequential Regression Multivariate Imputation.

== Calculations ==
Researchers test the framework on synthetic data, which is "the only source of ground truth on which they can objectively assess the performance of their algorithms".

Synthetic data can be generated through the use of random lines, having different orientations and starting positions. Datasets can get fairly complicated. A more complicated dataset can be generated by using a synthesizer build. To create a synthesizer build, first use the original data to create a model or equation that fits the data the best. This model or equation will be called a synthesizer build. This build can be used to generate more data.

Constructing a synthesizer build involves constructing a statistical model. In a linear regression line example, the original data can be plotted, and a best fit linear line can be created from the data. This line is a synthesizer created from the original data. The next step will be generating more synthetic data from the synthesizer build or from this linear line equation. In this way, the new data can be used for studies and research, and it protects the confidentiality of the original data.

David Jensen from the Knowledge Discovery Laboratory explains how to generate synthetic data: "Researchers frequently need to explore the effects of certain data characteristics on their data model." To help construct datasets exhibiting specific properties, such as auto-correlation or degree disparity, proximity can generate synthetic data having one of several types of graph structure: random graphs that are generated by some random process; lattice graphs having a ring structure; lattice graphs having a grid structure, etc. In all cases, the data generation process follows the same process:

1. Generate the empty graph structure.
2. Generate attribute values based on user-supplied prior probabilities.

Since the attribute values of one object may depend on the attribute values of related objects, the attribute generation process assigns values collectively.

== Applications ==
=== Fraud detection and confidentiality systems ===
Testing and training fraud detection and confidentiality systems are devised using synthetic data. Specific algorithms and generators are designed to create realistic data, which then assists in teaching a system how to react to certain situations or criteria. For example, intrusion detection software is tested using synthetic data. This data is a representation of the authentic data and may include intrusion instances that are not found in the authentic data. The synthetic data allows the software to recognize these situations and react accordingly. If synthetic data was not used, the software would only be trained to react to the situations provided by the authentic data and it may not recognize another type of intrusion.

=== Scientific research ===
Researchers doing clinical trials or any other research may generate synthetic data to aid in creating a baseline for future studies and testing.

Real data can contain information that researchers may not want released, so synthetic data is sometimes used to protect the privacy and confidentiality of a dataset. Using synthetic data reduces confidentiality and privacy issues since it holds no personal information and cannot be traced back to any individual.

Beyond privacy protection, synthetic data is also being explored for methodological innovation in drug development. For instance, synthetic data may be used to construct synthetic control arms as an alternative to conventional external control arms based on real-world data (RWD) or randomized controlled trials (RCTs). Collectively, regulatory agencies such as the FDA and EMA appear to be at various stages of recognizing and integrating AI-generated synthetic data into their methodologies. While there is growing consensus on the potential of such data to support model development and the broader lifecycle of medicinal products, to date no drug or medical device has been approved using solely or predominantly synthetic data—particularly not as a comparator arm generated entirely via data-driven algorithms. The quality and statistical handling of synthetic data are expected to become more prominent in future regulatory discussions, particularly in contexts such as predictive modeling (e.g., digital twins), where innovative approaches have already been referenced.

=== Machine learning ===
Synthetic data is increasingly being used for machine learning applications: a model is trained on a synthetically generated dataset with the intention of transfer learning to real data. Efforts have been made to enable more data science experiments via the construction of general-purpose synthetic data generators, such as the Synthetic Data Vault. In general, synthetic data has several natural advantages:

- once the synthetic environment is ready, it is fast and cheap to produce as much data as needed;
- synthetic data can have perfectly accurate labels, including labeling that may be very expensive or impossible to obtain by hand;
- the synthetic environment can be modified to improve the model and training;
- synthetic data can be used as a substitute for certain real data segments that contain, e.g., sensitive information.

This usage of synthetic data has been proposed for computer vision applications, in particular object detection, where the synthetic environment is a 3D model of the object, and learning to navigate environments by visual information.

In the context of large language model training, synthetic data generation has become a core component of the post-training pipeline. Techniques such as Self-Instruct, which uses a small seed set of 175 human-written instructions to generate 52,000 synthetic instruction-following examples, and Persona Hub, which generates over one billion synthetic personas for diverse instruction generation, have enabled the creation of large-scale training datasets at a fraction of the cost of human annotation.

At the same time, transfer learning remains a nontrivial problem, and synthetic data has not become ubiquitous yet. Research results indicate that adding a small amount of real data significantly improves transfer learning with synthetic data. Advances in generative adversarial networks (GAN), lead to the natural idea that one can produce data and then use it for training. Since at least 2016, such adversarial training has been successfully used to produce synthetic data of sufficient quality to produce state-of-the-art results in some domains, without even needing to re-mix real data in with the generated synthetic data.

== Examples ==
In 1987, a Navlab autonomous vehicle used 1200 synthetic road images as one approach to training.

In 2021, Microsoft released a database of 100,000 synthetic faces based on (500 real faces) that claims to "match real data in accuracy".

In 2023, Nature published a cover of their Nature's 10 series designed by Kim Albrecht of the project "Artificial Worldviews." The cover features a mapping of over 18,000 synthetically generated data points prompted from ChatGPT on the categories of knowledge.

DataFramer has published datasets on Hugging Face, including ehr-multi-file-patient-samples, a synthetic multi-file patient history dataset, and INSURE-Dial, a dialogue dataset for insurance-call phase detection and compliance verification.

== See also ==
- Generative model
- Model collapse
- Surrogate data
- Reinforcement learning
- Rendering (computer graphics)
