= Journal of Modern Applied Statistical Methods =

- Discipline: Statistics
- Language: English
- Edited by: Shlomo Sawilowsky

Publication details
- History: 2002–present
- Publisher: JMASM, Inc. (United States)
- Frequency: Biannually
- Open access: Yes

Standard abbreviations
- ISO 4: J. Mod. Appl. Stat. Methods

Indexing
- ISSN: 1538-9472

Links
- Journal homepage

The Journal of Modern Applied Statistical Methods is a biannual peer-reviewed open access journal. It was established in 2002 by Shlomo Sawilowsky, and is currently published by the Wayne State University Library System in Detroit, MI. The Current Index to Statistics classifies it as one of over 160 core statistics journals. The journal originally appeared as a print and electronic journal through volume 8(1) in 2009, and subsequently as an electronic journal only. It publishes peer-reviewed work pertaining to new statistical tests and the comparison of existing statistical tests; bootstrap, Jackknife, and resampling methods; nonparametric, robust, permutation, exact, and approximate randomization methods; and statistical algorithms, pseudorandom number generators, and simulation techniques. The journal is indexed in the Elsevier Bibliographic Database, EMBASE, Compendex, Geobase, PsycINFO, ScienceDirect, and Scopus. It is also listed in the Encyclopedia of Measurement and Statistics and Cabells.
