= Pitman closeness criterion =

In statistical theory, the Pitman closeness criterion, named after E. J. G. Pitman, is a way of comparing two candidate estimators for the same parameter. Under this criterion, estimator A is preferred to estimator B if the probability that estimator A is closer to the true value than estimator B is greater than one half. Here the meaning of closer is determined by the absolute difference in the case of a scalar parameter, or by the Mahalanobis distance for a vector parameter.
