= E. J. G. Pitman =

Australian mathematician

- Born: Edwin James George Pitman; 29 October 1897; Melbourne, Australia
- Died: 21 July 1993 (aged 95); Kingston, Tasmania
- Occupation: Mathematician
- Known for: Pitman permutation test Pitman nearness Pitman efficiency

Academic background
- Education: University of Melbourne

Edwin James George Pitman (29 October 1897 – 21 July 1993) was an Australian mathematician who made significant contributions to statistics and probability theory. In particular, he is remembered primarily as the originator of the Pitman permutation test, Pitman nearness and Pitman efficiency.

His work the Pitman measure of closeness or Pitman nearness concerning the exponential families of probability distributions has been studied extensively since the 1980s by C. R. Rao, Pranab K. Sen, and others.

The Pitman–Koopman–Darmois theorem states that only exponential families of probability distributions admit a sufficient statistic whose dimension remains bounded as the sample size grows.

== Biography ==
Pitman was born in Melbourne on 29 October 1897, and attended University of Melbourne, residing at Ormond College, where he graduated with First Class Honours. In 1926 he was appointed Professor of Mathematics at the University of Tasmania, which he held until his retirement in 1962.

He was a founding member and second President of the Australian Mathematical Society. He was also active within the Statistical Society of Australia, which in 1978 named the Pitman medal in his honour.

== Terminology ==
- For "the sum of squares of deviations from the mean," he coined the term squariance.
- For "the logarithm of the likelihood" he coined the term loglihood.

However, neither of these terms caught on.

== Pitman's published work (selected) ==
- Pitman, E. J. G. (1936). "Sufficient statistics and intrinsic accuracy". Mathematical Proceedings of the Cambridge Philosophical Society. 32 (4): 567–579. doi:10.1017/S0305004100019307.
- Pitman, E. J. G. (1937). "The "closest" estimates of statistical parameters". Mathematical Proceedings of the Cambridge Philosophical Society. 33 (2): 212–222. doi:10.1017/S0305004100019563.
- Pitman, E. J. G. (1937). "Significance tests which may be applied to samples from any populations". Supplement to the Journal of the Royal Statistical Society. 4 (1): 119–130. doi:10.2307/2984124.
- Pitman, E. J. G. (1937). "Significance tests which may be applied to samples from any populations. II. The correlation coefficient test". Supplement to the Journal of the Royal Statistical Society. 4 (2): 225–232. doi:10.2307/2983647.
- Pitman, E. J. G. (1938). "Significance tests which may be applied to samples from any populations. III. The analysis of variance test". Biometrika. 29 (3–4): 322–335. doi:10.1093/biomet/29.3-4.322.
- Pitman, E. J. G. (1939). "The estimation of the location and scale parameters of a continuous population of any given form". Biometrika. 30 (3–4): 391–421. doi:10.1093/biomet/30.3-4.391.
- Pitman, E. J. G. (1939). "Tests of hypotheses concerning location and scale parameters". Biometrika. 31 (1–2): 200–215. doi:10.1093/biomet/31.1-2.200.
- Pitman, E. J. G. (1957). "Statistics and science". Journal of the American Statistical Association. 52 (279): 322–330. doi:10.2307/2280902.
- Pitman, E. J. G. (1965). "Some remarks on statistical inference". Bernoulli 1713 Bayes 1763 Laplace 1813. New York: Springer-Verlag. pp. 209–216. doi:10.1007/978-3-642-99884-3_12.

== Autobiography ==
Pitman contributed a chapter, "Reminiscences of a mathematician who strayed into statistics", to the volume

- Joseph M. Gani (ed.) (1982) The Making of Statisticians, New York: Springer-Verlag. ISBN 0-387-90684-3

== Family ==
He had four children, including Jim Pitman, a professor of statistics at UC Berkeley.
