= Maurice Quenouille =

British statistician

Maurice Henry Quenouille
- Born: 9 October 1924; London, United Kingdom
- Died: 12 December 1973 (aged 49); Portugal
- Education: University of Cambridge; University of Oxford
- Known for: Jackknife resampling
- Scientific career
- Fields: Statistics
- Workplaces: Rothamsted Experimental Station; London School of Economics; Imperial College London; University of Southampton
- Academic advisors: M. S. Bartlett

Prof Maurice Henry Quenouille FRSE FRSS (1924 – 12 December 1973) was a 20th-century British statistician remembered as the creator of Jackknife resampling. He is also the designer of the Quenouille test in time series analysis, a statistical method used to assess whether residuals exhibit white noise behavior.

== Biography ==
The unusual surname is French in origin, meaning "distaff". The surname has transposed to Kenoly (its approximate pronunciation) in most English-speaking countries.

He was born in north London on 9 October 1924 of French ancestry. He was educated at Latymer School and St Paul's School, London. He then studied Mathematics at Jesus College, Cambridge, graduating BA around 1945. Here he had met Prof Ronald Fisher who convinced him of the importance between statistics and the objective of resolving actual rather than theoretical scientific problems. He therefore went to work at the Rothamsted Experimental Station.

In 1947 he began lecturing in Statistics at Aberdeen University. In 1949 Cambridge awarded him an MA degree.

In 1952 he was elected a Fellow of the Royal Society of Edinburgh aged only 28. His proposers were Reginald Victor Jones, William Ogilvy Kermack, David Cuthbertson and Alexander Aitken.

He obtained a further MA Degree from Oxford University in 1953 and joined the Institute of Statistics in Oxford where he stayed until 1955. In 1955 he moved to the London School of Economics as a lecturer and in 1964 to Imperial College, London. He had received a doctorate (DSc) from Cambridge in 1960. In 1965 he received the chair in Statistics at Southampton University and remained there until his premature death.

He died on holiday in Portugal on 12 December 1973 aged only 49. His position at Southampton University was filled by Prof T. M. F. Smith.

== Publications ==
- Quenouille, M. H. (1951). "Statistical studies of recorded energy expenditure in man". OCLC 4146398.
- Quenouille, M. H. (1965). Fundamentals of Statistical Reasoning. London: Griffin. ISBN 978-0-85-264002-9. OCLC 911748833.
- Quenouille, M. H. (1966). Introductory statistics. Oxford: Pergamon Press. ISBN 978-0-08-013783-4. OCLC 779769987.
- Quenouille, M. H. (1968). The analysis of multiple time-series (2nd ed.). London: Griffin. ISBN 0-85264-130-3. OCLC 29574738.
- Quenouille, M. H. (1972). Rapid statistical calculations : a collection of distribution-free and easy methods of estimation and testing (2nd ed.). London: Griffin. ISBN 0-85264-214-8. OCLC 5621827.
- John, J. A.; Quenouille, M. H. (1977). Experiments, design, and analysis (2nd ed.). London: Griffin. ISBN 0-85264-222-9. OCLC 4077098.
