= Phi coefficient =

Statistical measure of association for two binary variables

In statistics, the phi coefficient, also known as the mean square contingency coefficient or Yule coefficient of correlation and commonly denoted by φ or r_{φ}, is a measure of association between two binary variables. In machine learning and bioinformatics, it is known as the Matthews correlation coefficient (MCC). In meteorology and elsewhere, it is referred to as the Doolittle Measure of Association or Doolittle Skill Score. Described by Udny Yule in 1912 and given the name phi by Karl Pearson in the 1930s, it is a special case of the Pearson correlation coefficient.

== Definition ==
A Pearson correlation coefficient estimated for two binary variables will return the phi coefficient.

Two binary variables are considered positively associated if most of the data falls along the diagonal cells. In contrast, two binary variables are considered negatively associated if most of the data falls off the diagonal.

If we have a 2×2 table for two random variables x and y

	y = 1	y = 0	total
x = 1	$n_{11}$	$n_{10}$	$n_{1\bullet}$
x = 0	$n_{01}$	$n_{00}$	$n_{0\bullet}$
total	$n_{\bullet1}$	$n_{\bullet0}$	$n$

where n_{11}, n_{10}, n_{01}, n_{00}, are non-negative counts of numbers of observations that sum to n, the total number of observations. The phi coefficient that describes the association of x and y is

$$\varphi = \frac{n_{11}n_{00}-n_{10}n_{01}}{\sqrt{n_{1\bullet}n_{0\bullet}n_{\bullet0}n_{\bullet1}}}.$$

Phi is related to the point-biserial correlation coefficient and Cohen's d and estimates the extent of the relationship between two variables (2×2).

The phi coefficient can also be expressed using only $n$, $n_{11}$, $n_{1\bullet}$, and $n_{\bullet1}$, as

$$\varphi = \frac{nn_{11}-n_{1\bullet}n_{\bullet1}}{\sqrt{n_{1\bullet}n_{\bullet1}(n-n_{1\bullet})(n-n_{\bullet1})}}.$$

== Maximum values ==
In general, the Pearson correlation coefficient ranges from −1 to +1, where ±1 indicates perfect agreement or disagreement, and 0 indicates no relationship. The range of the phi coefficient—a special case of the Pearson correlation coefficient—is more tightly bound when either of the binary variables are class-imbalanced.

== Meteorology ==
In meteorology, the phi coefficient is referred to as the Doolittle Skill Score or the Doolittle Measure of Association, though this is actually off by a square root: Doolittle's original 1885 statistic matches phi squared, not phi itself. It was used by M. H. Doolittle in the 1880s to rate the accuracy of meteorologist John Park Finley's tornado predictions and other weather forecasts.

== Machine learning ==
The Matthews correlation coefficient (MCC) is widely used in the fields of bioinformatics and machine learning to evaluate the quality of binary (two-class) classifications. It is named for biochemist Brian W. Matthews, who described the measure in a foundational 1975 paper.

The coefficient accounts for true and false positives and negatives and is generally regarded as a balanced measure which can be used even if the classes are of very different sizes. The MCC is in essence a correlation coefficient between the observed and predicted binary classifications; it returns a value between −1 and +1. A coefficient of +1 represents a perfect prediction, 0 no better than random prediction and −1 indicates total disagreement between prediction and observation. However, if MCC equals neither −1, 0, or +1, it is not a reliable indicator of how similar a predictor is to random guessing because MCC is dependent on the dataset. MCC is closely related to the chi-square statistic for a 2×2 contingency table

$$|\text{MCC}| = \sqrt{\frac{\chi^2}{n}}$$

where n is the total number of observations.

While there is no perfect way of describing the confusion matrix of true and false positives and negatives by a single number, the Matthews correlation coefficient is generally regarded as being one of the best such measures. Other measures, such as the proportion of correct predictions (also termed accuracy), are not useful when the two classes are of very different sizes. For example, assigning every object to the larger set achieves a high proportion of correct predictions, but is not generally a useful classification.

The MCC can be calculated directly from the confusion matrix using the formula:

$$\text{MCC} = \frac{ \mathit{TP} \times \mathit{TN} - \mathit{FP} \times \mathit{FN} } {\sqrt{ (\mathit{TP} + \mathit{FP}) ( \mathit{TP} + \mathit{FN} ) ( \mathit{TN} + \mathit{FP} ) ( \mathit{TN} + \mathit{FN} ) } }$$

In this equation, TP is the number of true positives, TN the number of true negatives, FP the number of false positives and FN the number of false negatives. If exactly one of the four sums in the denominator is zero, the denominator can be arbitrarily set to one; this results in a Matthews correlation coefficient of zero, which can be shown to be the correct limiting value. In case two or more sums are zero (e.g. both labels and model predictions are all positive or negative), the limit does not exist.

The MCC can be calculated with the formula:

$$\text{MCC} =
\sqrt{\mathit{PPV} \times \mathit{TPR} \times \mathit{TNR} \times \mathit{NPV}}
- \sqrt{\mathit{FDR} \times \mathit{FNR} \times \mathit{FPR} \times \mathit{FOR}}$$

using the positive predictive value, the true positive rate, the true negative rate, the negative predictive value, the false discovery rate, the false negative rate, the false positive rate, and the false omission rate.

The original formula as given by Matthews was:

$$\begin{align}
N &= \mathit{TN} + \mathit{TP} + \mathit{FN} + \mathit{FP} \\[6pt]
S &= \frac{ \mathit{TP} + \mathit{FN} } { N } \\[6pt]
P &= \frac{ \mathit{TP} + \mathit{FP} } { N } \\[6pt]
\text{MCC} &= \frac{ \mathit{TP} / N - S \times P } {\sqrt{ P S ( 1 - S)  ( 1 - P ) } }
\end{align}$$

This is equal to the formula given above. As a correlation coefficient, the Matthews correlation coefficient is the geometric mean of the regression coefficients of the problem and its dual. The component regression coefficients of the Matthews correlation coefficient are markedness (Δp) and Youden's J statistic (informedness or Δp′). Markedness and informedness correspond to different directions of information flow and generalize Youden's J statistic, the $\delta p$ statistics, while their geometric mean generalizes the Matthews correlation coefficient to more than two classes.

Some scientists consider the Matthews correlation coefficient to be the most informative single score to establish the quality of a binary classifier prediction in a confusion matrix context.

== Example ==
Given a sample of 12 pictures, 8 of cats and 4 of dogs, where cats belong to class 1 and dogs belong to class 0,

actual = [1,1,1,1,1,1,1,1,0,0,0,0],

assume that a classifier that distinguishes between cats and dogs is trained, and we take the 12 pictures and run them through the classifier, and the classifier makes 9 accurate predictions and misses 3: 2 cats wrongly predicted as dogs (first 2 predictions) and 1 dog wrongly predicted as a cat (last prediction).

prediction = [0,0,1,1,1,1,1,1,0,0,0,1]

With these two labelled sets (actual and predictions) we can create a confusion matrix that will summarize the results of testing the classifier:

Predicted class Actual class	Cat	Dog
Cat	**6**	2
Dog	1	**3**

In this confusion matrix, of the 8 cat pictures, the system judged that 2 were dogs, and of the 4 dog pictures, it predicted that 1 was a cat. All correct predictions are located in the diagonal of the table (highlighted in bold), so it is easy to visually inspect the table for prediction errors, as they will be represented by values outside the diagonal.

In abstract terms, the confusion matrix is as follows:

Predicted class Actual class	P	N
P	**TP**	FN
N	FP	**TN**

where P = positive; N = negative; TP = truepositive; FP = false positive; TN = true negative; FN = false negative.

Plugging the numbers from the formula:

$$\text{MCC} = \frac{6 \times 3 - 1 \times 2}{\sqrt{(6 + 1) \times (6 + 2) \times (3 + 1) \times (3 + 2)}} = \frac{16}{\sqrt{1120}} \approx 0.478$$

== Confusion matrix ==
Let us define an experiment from P positive instances and N negative instances for some condition. The four outcomes can be formulated in a 2×2 contingency table or confusion matrix, as follows:

		Predicted condition		^{Sources:}	
	Total population = P + N	Predicted positive	Predicted negative	Informedness, bookmaker informedness (BM) = TPR + TNR − 1	Prevalence threshold (PT) = (√TPR × FPR − FPR)/(TPR − FPR)
Actual condition	Real Positive (P) (Note: the number of real positive cases in the data)	True positive (TP), hit (Note: A test result that correctly indicates the presence of a condition or characteristic)	False negative (FN), miss, underestimation	True positive rate (TPR), recall, sensitivity (SEN), probability of detection, hit rate, power = TP/P = 1 − FNR	False negative rate (FNR), miss rate type II error (Note: Type II error: A test result which wrongly indicates that a particular condition or attribute is absent) = FN/P = 1 − TPR
Actual condition	Real Negative (N) (Note: the number of real negative cases in the data)	False positive (FP), false alarm, overestimation	True negative (TN), correct rejection (Note: A test result that correctly indicates the absence of a condition or characteristic)	False positive rate (FPR), probability of false alarm, fall-out type I error (Note: Type I error: A test result which wrongly indicates that a particular condition or attribute is present) = FP/N = 1 − TNR	True negative rate (TNR), specificity (SPC), selectivity = TN/N = 1 − FPR
	Prevalence = P/(P + N)	Positive predictive value (PPV), precision = TP/(TP + FP) = 1 − FDR	False omission rate (FOR) = FN/(TN + FN) = 1 − NPV	Positive likelihood ratio (LR+) = TPR/FPR	Negative likelihood ratio (LR−) = FNR/TNR
	Accuracy (ACC) = (TP + TN)/(P + N)	False discovery rate (FDR) = FP/(TP + FP) = 1 − PPV	Negative predictive value (NPV) = TN/(TN + FN) = 1 − FOR	Markedness (MK), deltaP (Δp) = PPV + NPV − 1	Diagnostic odds ratio (DOR) = (LR+)/(LR−) = (TP × TN)/(FP × FN)
	Balanced accuracy (BA) = (TPR + TNR)/2	F_{1} score = (2 PPV × TPR)/(PPV + TPR) = (2 TP)/(2 TP + FP + FN)	Fowlkes–Mallows index (FM) = √PPV × TPR	phi or Matthews correlation coefficient (MCC) = √TPR × TNR × PPV × NPV - √FNR × FPR × FOR × FDR	Threat score (TS), critical success index (CSI), Jaccard index = TP/(TP + FN + FP)

== Multiclass case ==
The Matthews correlation coefficient has been generalized to the multiclass case. The generalization called the $R_K$ statistic (for K different classes) was defined in terms of a $K\times K$ confusion matrix $C$ .

$$\text{MCC} =
\frac{\sum_{k}\sum_{l}\sum_{m} C_{kk}C_{lm} - C_{kl}C_{mk}}{
\sqrt{\sum_{k}\left(\sum_l C_{kl}\right)\left(\sum_{k' | k' \neq k}\sum_{l'} C_{k'l'}\right)}
\sqrt{\sum_{k}\left(\sum_l C_{lk}\right)\left(\sum_{k' | k' \neq k}\sum_{l'} C_{l'k'}\right)}
}$$

When there are more than two classes the MCC will no longer range between −1 and +1. Instead the minimum value will be between −1 and 0 depending on the true distribution. The maximum value is always +1.

This formula can be more easily understood by defining intermediate variables:

- $i$ is the actual value index
- $j$ is the predicted value index
- $K$ is the total number of classes
- $t_k = \sum_i C_{ik}$ the number of times class k truly occurred,
- $p_k = \sum_j C_{kj}$ the number of times class k was predicted,
- $c = \sum_{k} C_{kk}$ the total number of samples correctly predicted,
- $s = \sum_i \sum_j C_{ij}$ the total number of samples. This allows the formula to be expressed as:

$$\text{MCC} =
\frac{cs - \vec{t} \cdot \vec{p}}{
\sqrt{s^2 - \vec{p} \cdot \vec{p}}
\sqrt{s^2 - \vec{t} \cdot \vec{t}}
}$$

Predicted class Actual class	Cat	Dog	Sum
Cat	6	2	8
Dog	1	3	4
Sum	7	5	12

Using above formula to compute MCC measure for the dog and cat example discussed above, where the confusion matrix is treated as a 2 × Multiclass example:

$$\text{MCC}=\frac{(6+3)\times{\color{green}12}\;-\;{\color{blue}5}\times{\color{brown}4}\;-\;{\color{purple}7}\times{\color{maroon}8}}{\sqrt{{\color{green}12}^2-{\color{blue}5}^2-{\color{purple}7}^2}\sqrt{{\color{green}12}^2-{\color{brown}4}^2-{\color{maroon}8}^2}}=\frac{32}{\sqrt{4480}}\approx 0.478$$

An alternative generalization of the Matthews Correlation Coefficient to more than two classes was given by Powers by the definition of Correlation as the geometric mean of Informedness and Markedness.

Several generalizations of the Matthews Correlation Coefficient to more than two classes along with new Multivariate Correlation Metrics for multinary classification have been presented by P Stoica and P Babu.

== See also ==
- Cohen's kappa
- Contingency table
- Cramér's V, a similar measure of association between nominal variables.
- F1 score
- Fowlkes–Mallows index
- Polychoric correlation (subtype: Tetrachoric correlation), when variables are seen as dichotomized versions of (latent) continuous variables
