= Post-test odds =

Post-test odds may refer to:

- Bayes' theorem in terms of odds and likelihood ratio
- Post test odds as related to pre- and post-test probability
