= Brian Matthews (biochemist) =

Australian biochemist and biophysicist

Brian W. Matthews
- Born: 1938 (age 87–88); Mount Barker, South Australia
- Education: University of Adelaide
- Known for: Matthews correlation coefficient
- Scientific career
- Workplaces: University of Cambridge; University of Oregon; Howard Hughes Medical Institute
- Academic advisors: David M. Blow
- Website: molbio.uoregon.edu/matthews/

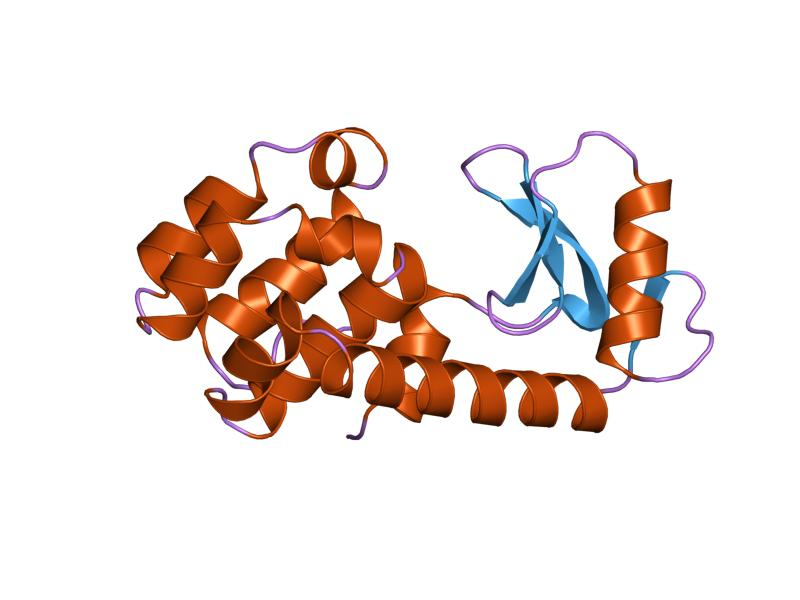
T4 lysozyme ribbon schematic (from PDB 1LZM)

Brian W. Matthews is a biochemist and biophysicist educated at the University of Adelaide, contributor to x-ray crystallographic methodology at the University of Cambridge, and since 1970 at the University of Oregon as Professor of Physics and HHMI investigator in the Institute of Molecular Biology.

He created hundreds of mutants of T4 lysozyme (making it the most common structure in the PDB), determined their structure by x-ray crystallography and measured their melting temperatures. Starting from questions about the basis of "temperature-sensitive" mutations, his work has explicated much about the general energetic and structural effects of mutations in proteins. He also solved early structures of the thermophilic bacterial enzyme thermolysin, the helix-turn-helix DNA-binding transcription factor lambda Cro repressor, and the light-antenna bacteriochlorophyll protein.

Beyond his contributions to biochemistry, Matthews is also known in the machine learning community for the Matthews correlation coefficient, which he introduced in a paper in 1975. The coefficient is used as a measure of the quality of binary and, in its generalized form, also multiclass classifications.

Matthews has been a member of the National Academy of Sciences since 1986. He was the editor of the scientific journal Protein Science.
