= Positive and negative predictive values =

Statistical measures of whether a finding is likely to be true

Positive and negative predictive values

Positive and negative predictive values - 2

The positive and negative predictive values (PPV and NPV respectively) are the proportions of positive and negative results in statistics and diagnostic tests that are true positive and true negative results, respectively. The PPV and NPV describe the performance of a diagnostic test or other statistical measure. A high result can be interpreted as indicating the accuracy of such a statistic. The PPV and NPV are not intrinsic to the test (as true positive rate and true negative rate are); they depend also on the prevalence. Both PPV and NPV can be derived using Bayes' theorem.

Although sometimes used synonymously, a positive predictive value generally refers to what is established by control groups, while a post-test probability refers to a probability for an individual. Still, if the individual's pre-test probability of the target condition is the same as the prevalence in the control group used to establish the positive predictive value, the two are numerically equal.

In information retrieval, the PPV statistic is often called the precision.

== Definition ==
=== Positive predictive value (PPV) ===
The positive predictive value (PPV), or precision, is defined as

$$\text{PPV} = \frac{\text{Number of true positives}}{\text{Number of true positives} + \text{Number of false positives}} = \frac{\text{Number of true positives}}{\text{Number of positive calls}}$$

where a "true positive" is the event that the test makes a positive prediction, and the subject has a positive result under the gold standard, and a "false positive" is the event that the test makes a positive prediction, and the subject has a negative result under the gold standard. The ideal value of the PPV, with a perfect test, is 1 (100%), and the worst possible value would be zero.

The PPV can also be computed from sensitivity, specificity, and the prevalence of the condition:

$$\text{PPV} = \frac{\text{sensitivity} \times \text{prevalence}}{\text{sensitivity} \times \text{prevalence} + (1 - \text{specificity}) \times (1 - \text{prevalence})}$$

cf. Bayes' theorem

The complement of the PPV is the false discovery rate (FDR):

$$\text{FDR} = 1 - \text{PPV} = \frac{\text{Number of false positives}}{\text{Number of true positives} + \text{Number of false positives}} = \frac{\text{Number of false positives}}{\text{Number of positive calls}}$$

=== Negative predictive value (NPV) ===
The negative predictive value is defined as:

$$\text{NPV} = \frac{\text{Number of true negatives}}{\text{Number of true negatives}+\text{Number of false negatives}} =
\frac{\text{Number of true negatives}}{\text{Number of negative calls}}$$

where a "true negative" is the event that the test makes a negative prediction, and the subject has a negative result under the gold standard, and a "false negative" is the event that the test makes a negative prediction, and the subject has a positive result under the gold standard. With a perfect test, one which returns no false negatives, the value of the NPV is 1 (100%), and with a test which returns no true negatives the NPV value is zero.

The NPV can also be computed from sensitivity, specificity, and prevalence:

$$\text{NPV} = \frac{\text{specificity} \times (1-\text{prevalence})}{\text{specificity} \times (1-\text{prevalence}) + (1-\text{sensitivity}) \times \text{prevalence}}$$

$$\text{NPV} = \frac{TN}{TN + FN}$$

The complement of the NPV is the false omission rate (FOR):

$$\text{FOR} = 1 - \text{NPV} = \frac{\text{Number of false negatives}}{\text{Number of true negatives}+\text{Number of false negatives}} =
\frac{\text{Number of false negatives}}{\text{Number of negative calls}}$$

Although sometimes used synonymously, a negative predictive value generally refers to what is established by control groups, while a negative post-test probability rather refers to a probability for an individual. Still, if the individual's pre-test probability of the target condition is the same as the prevalence in the control group used to establish the negative predictive value, then the two are numerically equal.

=== Relationship ===
The following diagram illustrates how the positive predictive value, negative predictive value, sensitivity, and specificity are related.

		Predicted condition		^{Sources:}	
	Total population = P + N	Predicted positive	Predicted negative	Informedness, bookmaker informedness (BM) = TPR + TNR − 1	Prevalence threshold (PT) = (√TPR × FPR − FPR)/(TPR − FPR)
Actual condition	Real Positive (P) (Note: the number of real positive cases in the data)	True positive (TP), hit (Note: A test result that correctly indicates the presence of a condition or characteristic)	False negative (FN), miss, underestimation	True positive rate (TPR), recall, sensitivity (SEN), probability of detection, hit rate, power = TP/P = 1 − FNR	False negative rate (FNR), miss rate type II error (Note: Type II error: A test result which wrongly indicates that a particular condition or attribute is absent) = FN/P = 1 − TPR
Actual condition	Real Negative (N) (Note: the number of real negative cases in the data)	False positive (FP), false alarm, overestimation	True negative (TN), correct rejection (Note: A test result that correctly indicates the absence of a condition or characteristic)	False positive rate (FPR), probability of false alarm, fall-out type I error (Note: Type I error: A test result which wrongly indicates that a particular condition or attribute is present) = FP/N = 1 − TNR	True negative rate (TNR), specificity (SPC), selectivity = TN/N = 1 − FPR
	Prevalence = P/(P + N)	Positive predictive value (PPV), precision = TP/(TP + FP) = 1 − FDR	False omission rate (FOR) = FN/(TN + FN) = 1 − NPV	Positive likelihood ratio (LR+) = TPR/FPR	Negative likelihood ratio (LR−) = FNR/TNR
	Accuracy (ACC) = (TP + TN)/(P + N)	False discovery rate (FDR) = FP/(TP + FP) = 1 − PPV	Negative predictive value (NPV) = TN/(TN + FN) = 1 − FOR	Markedness (MK), deltaP (Δp) = PPV + NPV − 1	Diagnostic odds ratio (DOR) = (LR+)/(LR−) = (TP × TN)/(FP × FN)
	Balanced accuracy (BA) = (TPR + TNR)/2	F_{1} score = (2 PPV × TPR)/(PPV + TPR) = (2 TP)/(2 TP + FP + FN)	Fowlkes–Mallows index (FM) = √PPV × TPR	phi or Matthews correlation coefficient (MCC) = √TPR × TNR × PPV × NPV - √FNR × FPR × FOR × FDR	Threat score (TS), critical success index (CSI), Jaccard index = TP/(TP + FN + FP)

Note that the positive and negative predictive values can only be estimated using data from a cross-sectional study or other population-based study in which valid prevalence estimates may be obtained. In contrast, the sensitivity and specificity can be estimated from case-control studies.

=== Worked example ===
Suppose the fecal occult blood (FOB) screen test is used in 2,030 people to look for bowel cancer:

		Fecal occult blood screen test outcome			
	Total population (pop.) = 2030	Test outcome positive	Test outcome negative	Accuracy (ACC) = (TP + TN) / pop. = (20 + 1820) / 2030 ≈ 90.64%	F_{1} score = 2 × (precision × recall)/(precision + recall) ≈ 0.174
Patients with bowel cancer (as confirmed on endoscopy)	Actual condition positive (AP) = 30 (2030 × 1.48%)	True positive (TP) = 20 (2030 × 1.48% × 67%)	False negative (FN) = 10 (2030 × 1.48% × (100% − 67%))	True positive rate (TPR), recall, sensitivity = TP / AP = 20 / 30 ≈ 66.7%	False negative rate (FNR), miss rate = FN / AP = 10 / 30 ≈ 33.3%
Patients with bowel cancer (as confirmed on endoscopy)	Actual condition negative (AN) = 2000 (2030 × (100% − 1.48%))	False positive (FP) = 180 (2030 × (100% − 1.48%) × (100% − 91%))	True negative (TN) = 1820 (2030 × (100% − 1.48%) × 91%)	False positive rate (FPR), fall-out, probability of false alarm = FP / AN = 180 / 2000 = 9.0%	Specificity, selectivity, true negative rate (TNR) = TN / AN = 1820 / 2000 = 91%
	Prevalence = AP / pop. = 30 / 2030 ≈ 1.48%	Positive predictive value (PPV), precision = TP / (TP + FP) = 20 / (20 + 180) = 10%	False omission rate (FOR) = FN / (FN + TN) = 10 / (10 + 1820) ≈ 0.55%	Positive likelihood ratio (LR+) = TPR/FPR = (20 / 30) / (180 / 2000) ≈ 7.41	Negative likelihood ratio (LR−) = FNR/TNR = (10 / 30) / (1820 / 2000) ≈ 0.366
		False discovery rate (FDR) = FP / (TP + FP) = 180 / (20 + 180) = 90.0%	Negative predictive value (NPV) = TN / (FN + TN) = 1820 / (10 + 1820) ≈ 99.45%	Diagnostic odds ratio (DOR) = (LR+)/(LR−) ≈ 20.2	

The small positive predictive value (PPV = 10%) indicates that many of the positive results from this testing procedure are false positives. Thus it will be necessary to follow up any positive result with a more reliable test to obtain a more accurate assessment as to whether cancer is present. Nevertheless, such a test may be useful if it is inexpensive and convenient. The strength of the FOB screen test is instead in its negative predictive value — which, if negative for an individual, gives us a high confidence that its negative result is true.

== Problems ==
=== Other individual factors ===
Note that the PPV is not intrinsic to the test—it depends also on the prevalence. Due to the large effect of prevalence upon predictive values, a standardized approach has been proposed, where the PPV is normalized to a prevalence of 50%. PPV is directly proportional to the prevalence of the disease or condition. In the above example, if the group of people tested had included a higher proportion of people with bowel cancer, then the PPV would probably come out higher and the NPV lower. If everybody in the group had bowel cancer, the PPV would be 100% and the NPV 0%.

To overcome this problem, NPV and PPV should only be used if the ratio of the number of patients in the disease group and the number of patients in the healthy control group used to establish the NPV and PPV is equivalent to the prevalence of the diseases in the studied population, or, in case two disease groups are compared, if the ratio of the number of patients in disease group 1 and the number of patients in disease group 2 is equivalent to the ratio of the prevalences of the two diseases studied. Otherwise, positive and negative likelihood ratios are more accurate than NPV and PPV, because likelihood ratios do not depend on prevalence.

When an individual being tested has a different pre-test probability of having a condition than the control groups used to establish the PPV and NPV, the PPV and NPV are generally distinguished from the positive and negative post-test probabilities, with the PPV and NPV referring to the ones established by the control groups, and the post-test probabilities referring to the ones for the tested individual (as estimated, for example, by likelihood ratios). Preferably, in such cases, a large group of equivalent individuals should be studied, in order to establish separate positive and negative predictive values for use of the test in such individuals.

=== Bayesian updating ===
Bayes' theorem confers inherent limitations on the accuracy of screening tests as a function of disease prevalence or pre-test probability. It has been shown that a testing system can tolerate significant drops in prevalence, up to a certain well-defined point known as the prevalence threshold, below which the reliability of a positive screening test drops precipitously. That said, Balayla et al. showed that sequential testing overcomes the aforementioned Bayesian limitations and thus improves the reliability of screening tests. For a desired positive predictive value $\rho$, where $\rho < 1$, that approaches some constant $k$, the number of positive test iterations $n_i$ needed is:

$$n_i =\lim_{k \to \rho}\left\lceil\frac{\ln\left[\frac{k(\phi-1)}{\phi(k-1)}\right]}{\ln\left[\frac{a}{1-b}\right]}\right\rceil$$

where

- $\rho$ is the desired PPV
- $n_i$ is the number of testing iterations necessary to achieve $\rho$
- $a$ is the sensitivity
- $b$ is the specificity
- $\phi$ is disease prevalence

Of note, the denominator of the above equation is the natural logarithm of the positive likelihood ratio (LR+). Also, note that a critical assumption is that the tests must be independent. As described Balayla et al., repeating the same test may violate this independence assumption and in fact "A more natural and reliable method to enhance the positive predictive value would be, when available, to use a different test with different parameters altogether after an initial positive result is obtained."

=== Different target conditions ===
PPV is used to indicate the probability that in case of a positive test, that the patient really has the specified disease. However, there may be more than one cause for a disease and any single potential cause may not always result in the overt disease seen in a patient. There is potential to mix up related target conditions of PPV and NPV, such as interpreting the PPV or NPV of a test as having a disease, when that PPV or NPV value actually refers only to a predisposition of having that disease.

An example is the microbiological throat swab used in patients with a sore throat. Usually publications stating PPV of a throat swab are reporting on the probability that this bacterium is present in the throat, rather than that the patient is ill from the bacteria found. If presence of this bacterium always resulted in a sore throat, then the PPV would be very useful. However the bacteria may colonise individuals in a harmless way and never result in infection or disease. Sore throats occurring in these individuals are caused by other agents such as a virus. In this situation the gold standard used in the evaluation study represents only the presence of bacteria (that might be harmless) but not a causal bacterial sore throat illness. It can be proven that this problem will affect positive predictive value far more than negative predictive value. To evaluate diagnostic tests where the gold standard looks only at potential causes of disease, one may use an extension of the predictive value termed the Etiologic Predictive Value.

== See also ==
- Binary classification
- Sensitivity and specificity
- False discovery rate
- Relevance (information retrieval)
- Receiver-operator characteristic
- Diagnostic odds ratio
- Sensitivity index
