= Prevalence threshold =

Bayesian diagnostic threshold derived from the geometry of screening curves

Prevalence threshold is a mathematical concept in Bayesian statistics, diagnostic test interpretation, and screening theory. It denotes a distinguished value of disease prevalence, or pre-test probability, associated with the geometry of the curve that maps prior probability to positive predictive value for a diagnostic or screening test. In its standard binary form, the prevalence threshold is the point at which the positive predictive value curve has maximal curvature and, equivalently, the point at which the curve intersects the anti-diagonal of the unit probability square.

The concept belongs to a family of prevalence-sensitive measures used to interpret screening tests. It arises from the standard Bayesian relation among sensitivity and specificity, disease prevalence, likelihood ratios, and positive predictive value. The threshold does not replace sensitivity, specificity, predictive values, likelihood ratios, or clinical decision thresholds. Rather, it identifies a structural region of the prior-to-posterior transformation in which the interpretation of a positive result is especially sensitive to the underlying prevalence.

Although first formalized for medical screening, the prevalence-threshold framework can be written in the language of binary classification. In that setting, disease prevalence corresponds to the base rate of the positive class, positive predictive value corresponds to precision, and the prevalence threshold marks a base-rate regime in which precision begins to deteriorate rapidly relative to class prevalence. The prevalence threshold was first described by Dr. Jacques Balayla, a physician and epidemiologist at McGill University.

== Background ==
Screening is the presumptive identification of unrecognized disease in individuals who do not yet have a diagnosis. The classical Wilson–Jungner criteria and subsequent revisions emphasize that screening programs must consider not only the test itself, but also disease importance, treatment availability, harms, follow-up, and the organization of the screening pathway.

A central limitation of screening is that positive predictive value depends strongly on the prevalence of the target condition. A highly sensitive and specific test may still produce many false positive results in a low-prevalence population. This dependence is not a defect of a particular test but a consequence of Bayes' theorem. The prevalence threshold was proposed to identify, within this Bayesian relationship, a mathematically defined point separating regions of different inferential behavior.

== Basic notation ==
Let $D\in\{0,1\}$ denote disease status, with $D=1$ representing disease present and $D=0$ disease absent. Let $T^+$ denote a positive test result. The conventional parameters are:

$$a=P(T^+\mid D=1)$$

where $a$ is sensitivity, and:

$$b=P(T^-\mid D=0)$$

where $b$ is specificity. The false-positive rate is:

$$1-b=P(T^+\mid D=0)$$

Let disease prevalence, or pre-test probability, be:

$$\phi=P(D=1)$$

The positive likelihood ratio is:

$$\kappa=LR^+=\frac{a}{1-b}$$

For an informative positive result, $\kappa>1$, equivalently $a+b>1$.

== Screening equation ==
The positive predictive value after a positive result is:

$$\rho(\phi)=P(D=1\mid T^+)=\frac{a\phi}{a\phi+(1-b)(1-\phi)}$$

Using the positive likelihood ratio $\kappa=a/(1-b)$, this becomes the fractional-linear map:

$$\rho(\phi)=f_\kappa(\phi)=\frac{\kappa\phi}{1+(\kappa-1)\phi}$$

This function maps the unit interval to itself. If $\kappa=1$, the result is non-informative and $\rho(\phi)=\phi$. If $\kappa>1$, the curve lies above the diagonal $\rho=\phi$, so a positive result increases the posterior probability of disease. If $0<\kappa<1$, a positive result decreases the posterior probability, a situation corresponding to a result whose occurrence is less likely in disease than in non-disease.

The screening equation is a Möbius transformation of the probability interval. It has the composition law:

$$f_{\kappa_2}(f_{\kappa_1}(\phi))=f_{\kappa_1\kappa_2}(\phi)$$

Thus sequential independent positive evidence multiplies likelihood ratios and composes screening maps within the same fractional-linear family.

== Definition ==
For a binary test with positive likelihood ratio $\kappa>1$, the prevalence threshold $\phi_e$ is:

$$\phi_e=\frac{1}{1+\sqrt{\kappa}}$$

Equivalently, in sensitivity-specificity notation:

$$\phi_e=\frac{\sqrt{1-b}}{\sqrt{a}+\sqrt{1-b}}$$

The corresponding positive predictive value is:

$$\rho(\phi_e)=1-\phi_e=\frac{\sqrt{\kappa}}{1+\sqrt{\kappa}}$$

The pair $(\phi_e,\rho(\phi_e))$ is therefore:

$$\left(\frac{1}{1+\sqrt{\kappa}},\frac{\sqrt{\kappa}}{1+\sqrt{\kappa}}\right)$$

This identity implies:

$$\rho(\phi_e)+\phi_e=1$$

which is the anti-diagonal characterization of the threshold.

== Geometric characterization ==
=== Curvature of the screening curve ===
The screening curve is the graph of $\rho(\phi)$ in the unit probability square $[0,1]\times[0,1]$. Its first and second derivatives are:

$$\rho'(\phi)=\frac{\kappa}{[1+(\kappa-1)\phi]^2}$$

and:

$$\rho''(\phi)=\frac{-2\kappa(\kappa-1)}{[1+(\kappa-1)\phi]^3}$$

For a plane curve $y=\rho(\phi)$, geometric curvature is:

$$K(\phi)=\frac{|\rho''(\phi)|}{\{1+[\rho'(\phi)]^2\}^{3/2}}$$

Substitution gives a curvature function whose maximum occurs when:

$$1+(\kappa-1)\phi=\sqrt{\kappa}$$

Solving for $\phi$ gives:

$$\phi=\frac{\sqrt{\kappa}-1}{\kappa-1}=\frac{1}{1+\sqrt{\kappa}}$$

This is the prevalence threshold. The point is therefore the location of maximal geometric bending of the PPV-prevalence curve.

=== Anti-diagonal characterization ===
The same point is obtained by imposing intersection with the anti-diagonal of the unit square:

$$\rho(\phi)=1-\phi$$

Substituting the screening equation gives:

$$\frac{\kappa\phi}{1+(\kappa-1)\phi}=1-\phi$$

which simplifies to:

$$(\kappa-1)\phi^2+2\phi-1=0$$

The unique solution in $(0,1)$ is:

$$\phi_e=\frac{1}{1+\sqrt{\kappa}}$$

The curvature and anti-diagonal definitions therefore coincide for the binary positive-result screening map.

=== Maximum displacement from the diagonal ===
The vertical change in probability produced by a positive result is:

$$\Delta(\phi)=\rho(\phi)-\phi$$

Differentiating gives:

$$\Delta'(\phi)=\rho'(\phi)-1$$

The maximum vertical displacement from the identity line occurs when $\rho'(\phi)=1$, or:

$$\frac{\kappa}{[1+(\kappa-1)\phi]^2}=1$$

again yielding:

$$\phi=\phi_e$$

Thus the prevalence threshold can also be interpreted as the point of greatest absolute increase in disease probability produced by a positive result for a fixed $\kappa$. This interpretation links the local geometry of the curve to the intuitive idea of maximal Bayesian displacement.

=== Odds and logit form ===
Let prior odds be:

$$O(\phi)=\frac{\phi}{1-\phi}$$

Bayes' theorem in odds form gives:

$$O(\rho)=\kappa O(\phi)$$

Taking logarithms:

$$\operatorname{logit}(\rho)=\operatorname{logit}(\phi)+\log\kappa$$

At the prevalence threshold:

$$O(\phi_e)=\frac{1}{\sqrt{\kappa}}$$

and after a positive result:

$$O(\rho(\phi_e))=\sqrt{\kappa}$$

Therefore:

$$\operatorname{logit}(\phi_e)=-\frac{1}{2}\log\kappa$$

and:

$$\operatorname{logit}(\rho(\phi_e))=+\frac{1}{2}\log\kappa$$

The positive result carries the prior log-odds symmetrically across the neutral point $\operatorname{logit}(p)=0$. In this sense, $\phi_e$ is the prior probability from which a positive result of strength $\kappa$ moves belief from below even odds to above even odds by equal magnitude in log-odds space.

== Dependence on sensitivity and specificity ==
The prevalence threshold decreases as the positive likelihood ratio increases. Since:

$$\phi_e=\frac{1}{1+\sqrt{\kappa}}$$

one has:

$$\frac{\partial \phi_e}{\partial \kappa}=-\frac{1}{2\sqrt{\kappa}(1+\sqrt{\kappa})^2}<0$$

Thus stronger positive evidence lowers the prevalence needed for a positive result to maintain interpretive strength.

In terms of sensitivity $a$ and specificity $b$:

$$\phi_e=\frac{\sqrt{1-b}}{\sqrt a+\sqrt{1-b}}$$

The derivative with respect to sensitivity is:

$$\frac{\partial\phi_e}{\partial a}= -\frac{\sqrt{1-b}}{2\sqrt a(\sqrt a+\sqrt{1-b})^2}$$

The derivative with respect to specificity is:

$$\frac{\partial\phi_e}{\partial b}= -\frac{\sqrt a}{2\sqrt{1-b}(\sqrt a+\sqrt{1-b})^2}$$

Both are negative where the derivatives are defined, so increasing either sensitivity or specificity lowers the prevalence threshold. In low-prevalence screening, specificity often has especially visible practical importance because false positives are drawn from the large non-diseased portion of the population.

== Interpretation ==
The prevalence threshold is not the prevalence at which a test becomes good or bad in an absolute sense. It is a geometric transition point in the PPV-prevalence relationship. Below it, small changes in prevalence can have disproportionate effects on the positive predictive value; above it, the positive predictive value becomes progressively more saturated as prevalence rises.

This interpretation has several consequences:

- It explains why screening in low-prevalence populations may generate low PPV even when sensitivity and specificity appear high.
- It gives a single prevalence value, determined by the test's operating characteristics, that can be compared with the actual target-population prevalence.
- It separates structural test interpretation from clinical action. A test may be below its prevalence threshold but still be useful if the costs of follow-up are low or the disease is severe; conversely, a test may be above its threshold but still be inappropriate if downstream harms are large.
- It allows different tests to be compared not only by sensitivity, specificity, or likelihood ratio, but by the prevalence regime in which their positive results are most vulnerable to false discovery.

== Distinction from decision and treatment thresholds ==
The prevalence threshold is a geometric threshold, not a clinical action threshold. Treatment thresholds in decision analysis are derived from utilities, harms, benefits, and the relative consequences of treating versus not treating.

For a binary treatment decision, suppose action $A$ and non-action $N$ have utilities $U(A,D)$, $U(A,\neg D)$, $U(N,D)$, and $U(N,\neg D)$. Treatment is favored when expected utility under action exceeds expected utility under non-action:

$$pU(A,D)+(1-p)U(A,\neg D) > pU(N,D)+(1-p)U(N,\neg D)$$

Solving the equality gives the treatment threshold:

$$p_t=\frac{U(N,\neg D)-U(A,\neg D)}{[U(A,D)-U(N,D)]+[U(N,\neg D)-U(A,\neg D)]}$$

This quantity depends on values and consequences. By contrast, $\phi_e$ depends only on the likelihood ratio of the test. The two thresholds can be compared, but they answer different questions. The prevalence threshold asks where the screening map turns most sharply; the treatment threshold asks where action has greater expected utility than non-action. Decision curve analysis likewise evaluates clinical usefulness through net benefit rather than geometric curvature.

== Sequential testing ==
Diagnostic reasoning is often sequential. If conditionally independent positive results $T_1^+,\ldots,T_n^+$ have positive likelihood ratios $\kappa_1,\ldots,\kappa_n$, then posterior odds are:

$$O_n=O_0\prod_{i=1}^n\kappa_i$$

In log-odds form:

$$\log O_n=\log O_0+\sum_{i=1}^n\log\kappa_i$$

For repeated independent positive applications of the same test, the effective likelihood ratio is $\kappa^n$ and the screening map is:

$$\rho_n(\phi)=\frac{\kappa^n\phi}{1+(\kappa^n-1)\phi}$$

The corresponding prevalence threshold becomes:

$$\phi_{e,n}=\frac{1}{1+\kappa^{n/2}}$$

Thus repeated independent positive evidence lowers the threshold and steepens the screening curve.

If the desired posterior probability is $\rho^\star$, the number of positive iterations required is:

$$n=\left\lceil\frac{\log\left(\frac{\rho^\star(1-\phi)}{(1-\rho^\star)\phi}\right)}{\log\kappa}\right\rceil$$

when $\kappa>1$. This expression makes explicit the evidential distance created by low prevalence: a very low prior probability may require multiple independent favorable observations before the posterior reaches a target level.

== Orthogonal, parallel, and composite testing ==
For independent distinct tests with sensitivities $a_i$ and specificities $b_i$, all positive, the posterior probability is:

$$P(D=1\mid T_1^+,\ldots,T_n^+)=\frac{\phi\prod_{i=1}^n a_i}{\phi\prod_{i=1}^n a_i+(1-\phi)\prod_{i=1}^n(1-b_i)}$$

The effective positive likelihood ratio is:

$$\kappa_{\mathrm{eff}}=\prod_{i=1}^n\frac{a_i}{1-b_i}$$

and the corresponding prevalence threshold is:

$$\phi_{e,\mathrm{eff}}=\frac{1}{1+\sqrt{\kappa_{\mathrm{eff}}}}$$

This describes the idealized orthogonal case, where each test contributes non-redundant evidence. Parallel testing follows a different logic. If a composite rule declares the overall result positive when any component is positive, sensitivity typically increases but specificity may decrease. If it declares positive only when all components are positive, specificity typically increases but sensitivity may decrease. The prevalence threshold provides a way to translate these architectural changes into a prevalence-sensitive comparison of screening maps.

== Dependence and redundant evidence ==
The multiplicative formula for likelihood ratios assumes conditional independence. Clinical evidence often violates this assumption. Symptoms may share mechanisms, tests may measure overlapping biological pathways, and repeated measurements may be correlated. If independent evidence is wrongly assumed, posterior probabilities may be overconfident.

For a vector of findings $X=(X_1,\ldots,X_m)$, the exact profile likelihood ratio is:

$$\Lambda(X)=\frac{p(X\mid D=1)}{p(X\mid D=0)}$$

Under conditional independence this factorizes as:

$$\Lambda_{\mathrm{ind}}(X)=\prod_{i=1}^m\frac{p(X_i\mid D=1)}{p(X_i\mid D=0)}$$

In the presence of dependence, one may write:

$$\Lambda(X)=\Lambda_{\mathrm{ind}}(X)R(X)$$

where $R(X)$ is a redundancy or dependence correction. In copula language, if $c_1$ and $c_0$ describe disease-conditioned dependence structures, then a continuous version of the correction has the form:

$$R(X)=\frac{c_1(F_{11}(X_1),\ldots,F_{1m}(X_m))}{c_0(F_{01}(X_1),\ldots,F_{0m}(X_m))}$$

where the marginal likelihood terms are separated from the dependence structure. The prevalence threshold then shifts according to the effective likelihood ratio of the full evidence profile rather than the naive product of marginal likelihood ratios.

== Pretest probability construction ==
The prevalence threshold depends on the prior probability being compared with it. In practice, pretest probability may be crude population prevalence, setting-specific prevalence, or a patient-specific probability inferred from history and examination. The framework therefore distinguishes baseline prevalence from patient-specific pretest probability.

If $S=(S_1,\ldots,S_m)$ is a vector of symptoms or signs and $\phi_0$ is the setting-specific baseline probability, then:

$$O(D=1\mid S)=O_0\Lambda(S)$$

where:

$$\Lambda(S)=\frac{P(S\mid D=1)}{P(S\mid D=0)}$$

Under a naive conditional-independence model for binary symptoms:

$$\Lambda(S)=\prod_{i=1}^m\kappa_i^{s_i}\sigma_i^{1-s_i}$$

where $\kappa_i=P(S_i=1\mid D=1)/P(S_i=1\mid D=0)$ and $\sigma_i=P(S_i=0\mid D=1)/P(S_i=0\mid D=0)$. The patient-specific pretest probability is then:

$$\phi_{\mathrm{pre}}(S)=\frac{O_0\Lambda(S)}{1+O_0\Lambda(S)}$$

This construction treats the clinical history as an evidential operator that transforms baseline prevalence into a patient-level prior for downstream testing. Its validity depends on calibration, transportability, and the handling of correlated symptoms.

== Continuous biomarkers ==
For a continuous biomarker $X$ with disease-conditioned densities $f_1(x)$ and $f_0(x)$, the local likelihood ratio is:

$$\lambda(x)=\frac{f_1(x)}{f_0(x)}$$

The posterior probability after observing the exact value $x$ is:

$$P(D=1\mid X=x)=\frac{\phi\lambda(x)}{1-\phi+\phi\lambda(x)}$$

This is the same screening equation with $\kappa$ replaced by the value-specific likelihood ratio $\lambda(x)$. The local prevalence threshold is therefore:

$$\phi_e(x)=\frac{1}{1+\sqrt{\lambda(x)}}$$

Thresholded binary tests are thus projections of richer continuous evidence. A cutpoint on a biomarker collapses a continuum of local likelihood ratios into a binary result, potentially losing information contained in exact values.

== Receiver operating characteristic geometry ==
In ROC analysis, a continuous biomarker is converted into binary tests by varying a threshold. Each cutpoint generates a pair of sensitivity and specificity values. The slope of the ROC curve at a point can be interpreted, under regularity conditions, as a likelihood ratio at the corresponding biomarker value. The prevalence threshold can therefore be associated with a chosen operating point through its resulting positive likelihood ratio. It is not itself an ROC statistic, because it evaluates the PPV-prevalence map generated after a test operating point has been selected. However, it links ROC performance to the population in which the test is deployed.

== Information-theoretic interpretation ==
Bayesian updating can also be described using information-theoretic quantities. The entropy of a binary prior is:

$$H(\phi)=-\phi\log\phi-(1-\phi)\log(1-\phi)$$

The Kullback–Leibler divergence from prior $\phi$ to posterior $\rho(\phi)$ is:

$$D_{KL}(\rho\|\phi)=\rho(\phi)\log\frac{\rho(\phi)}{\phi}+[1-\rho(\phi)]\log\frac{1-\rho(\phi)}{1-\phi}$$

This quantity measures the informational displacement from prior to posterior.

The prevalence maximizing information gain need not coincide with the prevalence threshold. Geometric curvature, vertical displacement, and relative entropy measure different aspects of updating. Curvature identifies where the screening map bends most sharply; vertical displacement identifies the greatest absolute increase in probability; relative entropy measures the informational surprise or divergence between prior and posterior. Their comparison is one of the ways the prevalence-threshold framework separates geometric, probabilistic, and informational notions of diagnostic yield.

== Arc length of screening curves ==
A global geometric functional associated with the screening curve is its arc length:

$$L(\kappa)=\int_0^1\sqrt{1+\left(\frac{\kappa}{[1+(\kappa-1)\phi]^2}\right)^2}\,d\phi$$

For a non-informative test $\kappa=1$, the curve is the diagonal of the unit square and $L(1)=\sqrt 2$. As $\kappa$ grows, the curve approaches a limiting shape that rises rapidly near the origin and then runs close to the upper boundary of the square, with limiting length approaching $2$. Arc length therefore provides a global measure of the extent of the prior-to-posterior transformation, whereas the prevalence threshold is a local landmark of maximal curvature.

The two quantities are complementary. The threshold asks where the curve is most structurally responsive; arc length asks how much total geometric transformation the curve contains across all prior probabilities. In sequential testing, replacing $\kappa$ by $\kappa^n$ increases both the sharpness of the threshold region and the total arc length of the screening curve.

== Optimal transport interpretation ==
If a population is represented not by a single prevalence value but by a distribution of pretest probabilities, the screening map pushes that distribution forward into a distribution of posttest probabilities. If $\mu$ is a distribution over $\phi$, the posterior distribution after a positive result is the pushforward measure:

$$\nu=f_{\kappa\#}\mu$$

Distances between $\mu$ and $\nu$ may be studied using optimal transport metrics such as the Wasserstein distance. In one dimension, transport can be expressed through quantile functions. This population-level view distinguishes the intrinsic geometry of the screening map from the realized impact of that map in a particular clinical ecology. A test has one screening curve for a fixed likelihood ratio, but its population effect depends on where the population's pretest probabilities are concentrated.

Because $\phi_e$ maximizes $\rho(\phi)-\phi$, it is also the point of maximal vertical belief displacement for a positive result. A population concentrated near $\phi_e$ will experience larger average positive-result displacement than one concentrated near the extremes, all else equal.

== Projective algebra of evidence ==
The map:

$$f_\kappa(\phi)=\frac{\kappa\phi}{1+(\kappa-1)\phi}$$

is a projective transformation represented, up to scalar multiplication, by the matrix:

$$\begin{pmatrix}\kappa&0\\ \kappa-1&1\end{pmatrix}$$

Composition of evidence corresponds to multiplication in the projective family:

$$f_{\kappa_2}\circ f_{\kappa_1}=f_{\kappa_1\kappa_2}$$

The fixed points of the map are $0$ and $1$, corresponding to certainty of absence and certainty of presence. The prevalence threshold is not a fixed point; it is an affine-geometric landmark inside the interval. The projective view emphasizes that Bayesian diagnostic updating is structurally a transformation of odds, while the probability scale embeds that transformation into the unit interval.

== Differential-geometric interpretation ==
The prevalence-threshold framework uses ordinary Euclidean curvature in the probability square to define $\phi_e$. More general geometric approaches to probability treat distributions as points on statistical manifolds equipped with metrics such as the Fisher information metric. For a Bernoulli parameter $p$, the Fisher metric has local form:

$$ds^2=\frac{dp^2}{p(1-p)}$$

This highlights a distinction between probability-space geometry and intrinsic information geometry. The prevalence threshold is defined in the probability-square representation of screening curves. It is therefore a landmark of that representation, not a universal geodesic invariant across all possible coordinate systems. Later developments of the theory use differential-geometric language to study sequential diagnostic trajectories, but the core threshold remains the curvature maximum of the PPV-prevalence curve in the binary probability square.

== Diagnostic burden and optimization ==
A major implication of the prevalence-threshold framework is that diagnostic reasoning can be modeled as a constrained optimization problem. Evidence has benefits, but it also has burden: cost, time, discomfort, risk, access constraints, and opportunity cost. Let $\Psi_i$ denote the burden of test or observation $i$. A simple efficiency ratio is:

$$\eta_i=\frac{\log LR_i}{\Psi_i}$$

where $\log LR_i$ is the log-odds evidence supplied by the observation. If $O^*$ is the odds corresponding to a decision boundary and $O_0$ is the current odds, then the residual evidential work required is:

$$E_{\mathrm{res}}=\max\left\{0,\log\frac{O^*}{O_0}\right\}$$

A pathway can then be evaluated by whether it reaches a relevant threshold while minimizing total burden:

$$\min \sum_i\Psi_i$$

subject to:

$$\sum_i\log LR_i\ge \log\frac{O^*}{O_0}$$

This formulation relates threshold geometry to test sequencing, stopping rules, and clinical efficiency. It does not imply that the best test is always the most informative test. A less powerful test may be preferred if it supplies enough evidential movement at much lower burden.

== Screening paradox ==
The screening paradox describes a population-level dynamic in which successful screening and treatment reduce disease prevalence, which in turn reduces the future positive predictive value of the screening test. In a closed or semi-closed system, the same screening program that identifies disease can make later positive results less reliable by lowering the base rate.

The prevalence threshold organizes this paradox by distinguishing whether the post-intervention prevalence remains above or falls below $\phi_e$. If prevalence drops below the threshold, PPV deterioration becomes more pronounced. Proposed mathematical responses include serial testing, confirmatory testing, and altering the screening architecture so that the effective likelihood ratio increases in the new lower-prevalence environment.

== Public-health implications ==
At the public-health level, the prevalence threshold is used to compare test performance with the prevalence of the target condition in the screened population. This comparison can inform whether a positive result is likely to justify downstream confirmatory testing, quarantine, intervention, or counseling. It is especially relevant in mass screening, rare-disease screening, and low-risk population screening, where the number of false positives can be large even for technically strong tests.

The threshold should not be used alone to approve or reject a screening program. Screening policy also depends on disease severity, treatment availability, costs, downstream diagnostic capacity, equity, patient values, and the harms of false positives and false negatives.

== Applications ==
=== Obstetrics and gynecology ===
A 2021 study applied prevalence-threshold analysis to common obstetric and gynecologic screening tests, including gestational diabetes screening, non-invasive prenatal testing, combined first-trimester screening, group B streptococcus screening, cervical cytology, HPV testing, mammography, chlamydia and gonorrhea testing, and anti-Müllerian hormone testing for polycystic ovary syndrome. The study framed prevalence threshold as a way to quantify when low-risk screening populations are especially vulnerable to false-positive burden.

=== Non-invasive prenatal testing ===
Non-invasive prenatal testing (NIPT) has high analytic performance for several chromosomal conditions, but PPV varies substantially by condition and baseline risk. A 2024 article applied prevalence-threshold analysis to common conditions assessed through NIPT and compared the threshold values with observed prevalence levels. The analysis illustrates why high sensitivity and specificity do not guarantee high PPV when the screened condition is rare.

=== COVID-19 testing ===
During the COVID-19 pandemic, prevalence-sensitive interpretation of screening tests became prominent because population prevalence varied rapidly over time and across settings. The original prevalence-threshold paper included a SARS-CoV-2 PCR example, and a Canadian advisory discussion of self-testing referred to prevalence-threshold reasoning in the context of minimum acceptable PPV and false-positive risk.

=== Binary classification and machine learning ===
In machine learning, the same mathematics applies to binary classifiers. Sensitivity corresponds to recall or true positive rate, specificity corresponds to true negative rate, PPV corresponds to precision, and prevalence corresponds to the base rate of the positive class. In imbalanced classification, precision may deteriorate sharply when the positive class is rare. The prevalence threshold therefore provides a base-rate landmark for precision-prevalence curves.

A 2023 biomedical informatics paper compared prevalence threshold with Matthews correlation coefficient and the Fowlkes–Mallows index, situating it among metrics used to assess binary classification. This use differs from the original clinical interpretation but follows the same confusion-matrix algebra.

=== Differential diagnosis and decision support ===
The binary framework can be generalized to differential diagnosis by replacing a two-state disease variable with a probability vector over multiple competing diagnoses. Bayesian updating then moves a point on the probability simplex. Evidence changes relative odds among diagnoses, and decision regions partition the simplex into action zones. In this extension, a direct scalar prevalence threshold may no longer be sufficient; instead, threshold sets or action boundaries define regions where additional evidence is expected to change management.

== Relation to number needed to screen and number needed to treat ==
The threshold has implications for quantities such as number needed to screen (NNS) and number needed to treat (NNT). If prevalence is very low, more individuals must be screened to identify one true positive, and the false-positive burden may rise. If disease probability after testing remains low, treatment yield may remain poor even when relative risk reduction is substantial.

For a treatment with absolute risk reduction $ARR(\phi)$, the number needed to treat is:

$$NNT(\phi)=\frac{1}{ARR(\phi)}$$

When absolute benefit depends on baseline risk, diagnosis and risk stratification can be understood as processes that move a patient to a region where intervention has higher expected yield. The prevalence threshold is not itself an NNT threshold, but it can be used to describe how diagnostic evidence changes the baseline risk on which treatment yield depends.

== Verification bias and calibration ==
The prevalence-threshold calculation assumes valid estimates of sensitivity, specificity, and prevalence. These estimates may be distorted by verification bias, spectrum bias, selective testing, and transport failure. Verification bias occurs when disease status is confirmed preferentially among patients with certain test results; spectrum bias occurs when test performance differs across disease severity or patient mix.

Calibration is also central. A model is calibrated when predicted probabilities correspond to observed frequencies. Poor calibration can make a screening curve formally correct for one population but misleading in another.

== Limitations ==
The prevalence threshold has several limitations:

- It is derived under a binary disease model and a binary positive-result screening map.
- It assumes that sensitivity, specificity, and prevalence are known or adequately estimated.
- It does not incorporate utility, cost, patient preference, or treatment harm unless embedded in a separate decision model.
- It can be distorted by dependence among tests, verification bias, spectrum effects, and poor transportability.
- It is a local geometric landmark; it should not be treated as a complete measure of test performance.
- The formal literature is still smaller than the literature on older diagnostic metrics such as likelihood ratios, ROC curves, and decision thresholds.

These limitations are not merely practical. They define the scope of the concept. The threshold is most defensible as a structural descriptor of a Bayesian screening map, not as a universal rule for screening policy or clinical action.

== Criticism and reception ==
The prevalence threshold has been discussed mainly in specialist literature rather than in broad clinical guidelines. Its strongest clinical applications have been in obstetrics and gynecology, especially in contexts where low disease prevalence reduces PPV despite high test performance. It has also been considered as a classification metric in biomedical informatics.

The principal criticism is that the concept may be overinterpreted if separated from decision analysis. A prevalence below $\phi_e$ does not automatically imply that screening should not occur, and a prevalence above $\phi_e$ does not automatically imply that screening is justified. Those conclusions require assessment of harms, costs, benefits, equity, confirmatory testing, and treatment availability.

== See also ==
- Bayes' theorem
- Base rate fallacy
- Binary classification
- Clinical decision support system
- Diagnostic odds ratio
- False positive paradox
- Likelihood ratios in diagnostic testing
- Positive and negative predictive values
- Receiver operating characteristic
- Screening (medicine)
- Sensitivity and specificity
