= Predictive value of tests =

Predictive value of tests is the probability of a target condition given by the result of a test, often in regard to medical tests.

- In cases where binary classification can be applied to the test results (such as yes versus no, test target (substance, symptom, sign, etc.) being present versus absent, or a positive or negative test), then each of the two outcomes has a separate predictive value. For example, for a positive or negative test, the predictive values are termed positive predictive value or negative predictive value, respectively.
- In cases where the test result is of a continuous value, the predictive value generally changes continuously along with the value. For example, for a pregnancy test that displays the urine concentration of hCG, the predictive value increases with increasing hCG value.

A conversion of continuous values into binary values can be performed, such as designating a pregnancy test as "positive" above a certain cutoff value, but this confers a loss of information and generally results in less accurate predictive values.

== See also ==
- Positive predictive value
- Negative predictive value
