= Likelihood ratios in diagnostic testing =

Likelihood ratios used for assessing the value of performing a diagnostic test

In evidence-based medicine, likelihood ratios are used for assessing the value of performing a diagnostic test. They combine sensitivity and specificity into a single metric that indicates how much a test result shifts the probability that a condition (such as a disease) is present. The first description of the use of likelihood ratios for decision rules was made at a symposium on information theory in 1954. In medicine, likelihood ratios were introduced between 1975 and 1980. There is a multiclass version of these likelihood ratios.

== Calculation ==
Two versions of the likelihood ratio exist, one for positive and one for negative test results. Respectively, they are known as the positive likelihood ratio (LR+, likelihood ratio positive, likelihood ratio for positive results) and negative likelihood ratio (LR–, likelihood ratio negative, likelihood ratio for negative results).

The positive likelihood ratio is calculated as

$$\text{LR}+ = \frac{\text{sensitivity}}{1 - \text{specificity}}$$

which is equivalent to

$$\text{LR}+ = \frac{\Pr({T+}\mid D+)}{\Pr({T+}\mid D-)}$$

or "the probability of a person who has the disease testing positive divided by the probability of a person who does not have the disease testing positive." Here "T+" or "T−" denote that the result of the test is positive or negative, respectively. Likewise, "D+" or "D−" denote that the disease is present or absent, respectively. So "true positives" are those that test positive (T+) and have the disease (D+), and "false positives" are those that test positive (T+) but do not have the disease (D−).

The negative likelihood ratio is calculated as

$$\text{LR}- = \frac{1 - \text{sensitivity}}{\text{specificity}}$$

which is equivalent to

$$\text{LR}- = \frac{\Pr({T-}\mid D+)}{\Pr({T-}\mid D-)}$$

or "the probability of a person who has the disease testing negative divided by the probability of a person who does not have the disease testing negative."

The calculation of likelihood ratios for tests with continuous values or more than two outcomes is similar to the calculation for dichotomous outcomes; a separate likelihood ratio is simply calculated for every level of test result and is called interval or stratum specific likelihood ratios.

The pretest odds of a particular diagnosis, multiplied by the likelihood ratio, determines the post-test odds. This calculation is based on Bayes' theorem. (Note that odds can be calculated from, and then converted to, probability.)

== Application to medicine ==
Pretest probability refers to the chance that an individual in a given population has a disorder or condition; this is the baseline probability prior to the use of a diagnostic test. Post-test probability refers to the probability that a condition is truly present given a positive test result. For a good test in a population, the post-test probability will be meaningfully higher or lower than the pretest probability. A high likelihood ratio indicates a good test for a population, and a likelihood ratio close to one indicates that a test may not be appropriate for a population.

For a screening test, the population of interest might be the general population of an area. For diagnostic testing, the ordering clinician will have observed some symptom or other factor that raises the pretest probability relative to the general population. A likelihood ratio of greater than 1 for a test in a population indicates that a positive test result is evidence that a condition is present. If the likelihood ratio for a test in a population is not clearly better than one, the test will not provide good evidence: the post-test probability will not be meaningfully different from the pretest probability. Knowing or estimating the likelihood ratio for a test in a population allows a clinician to better interpret the result.

Research suggests that physicians rarely make these calculations in practice, however, and when they do, they often make errors. A randomized controlled trial compared how well physicians interpreted diagnostic tests that were presented as either sensitivity and specificity, a likelihood ratio, or an inexact graphic of the likelihood ratio, found no difference between the three modes in interpretation of test results.

== Estimation table ==
This table provide examples of how changes in the likelihood ratio affects post-test probability of disease.

Likelihood ratio	Approximate* change in probability	Effect on posttest Probability of disease
Values between 0 and 1 decrease the probability of disease (−LR)		
0.1	−45%	Large decrease
0.2	−30%	Moderate decrease
0.5	−15%	Slight decrease
1	−0%	None
Values greater than 1 increase the probability of disease (+LR)		
1	+0%	None
2	+15%	Slight increase
5	+30%	Moderate increase
10	+45%	Large increase

*These estimates are accurate to within 10% of the calculated answer for all pre-test probabilities between 10% and 90%. The average error is only 4%. For polar extremes of pre-test probability >90% and <10%, see Estimation of pre- and post-test probability section below.

=== Estimation example ===
1. Pre-test probability: For example, if about 2 out of every 5 patients with abdominal distension have ascites, then the pretest probability is 40%.
2. Likelihood Ratio: An example "test" is that the physical exam finding of bulging flanks has a positive likelihood ratio of 2.0 for ascites.
3. Estimated change in probability: Based on table above, a likelihood ratio of 2.0 corresponds to an approximately +15% increase in probability.
4. Final (post-test) probability: Therefore, bulging flanks increases the probability of ascites from 40% to about 55% (i.e., 40% + 15% = 55%, which is within 2% of the exact probability of 57%).

== Calculation example ==
A medical example is the likelihood that a given test result would be expected in a patient with a certain disorder compared to the likelihood that same result would occur in a patient without the target disorder.

Some sources distinguish between LR+ and LR−. A worked example is shown below.

A worked example
A diagnostic test with sensitivity 67% and specificity 91% is applied to 2030 people to look for a disorder with a population prevalence of 1.48%

		Fecal occult blood screen test outcome			
	Total population (pop.) = 2030	Test outcome positive	Test outcome negative	Accuracy (ACC) = (TP + TN) / pop. = (20 + 1820) / 2030 ≈ 90.64%	F_{1} score = 2 × (precision × recall)/(precision + recall) ≈ 0.174
Patients with bowel cancer (as confirmed on endoscopy)	Actual condition positive (AP) = 30 (2030 × 1.48%)	True positive (TP) = 20 (2030 × 1.48% × 67%)	False negative (FN) = 10 (2030 × 1.48% × (100% − 67%))	True positive rate (TPR), recall, sensitivity = TP / AP = 20 / 30 ≈ 66.7%	False negative rate (FNR), miss rate = FN / AP = 10 / 30 ≈ 33.3%
Patients with bowel cancer (as confirmed on endoscopy)	Actual condition negative (AN) = 2000 (2030 × (100% − 1.48%))	False positive (FP) = 180 (2030 × (100% − 1.48%) × (100% − 91%))	True negative (TN) = 1820 (2030 × (100% − 1.48%) × 91%)	False positive rate (FPR), fall-out, probability of false alarm = FP / AN = 180 / 2000 = 9.0%	Specificity, selectivity, true negative rate (TNR) = TN / AN = 1820 / 2000 = 91%
	Prevalence = AP / pop. = 30 / 2030 ≈ 1.48%	Positive predictive value (PPV), precision = TP / (TP + FP) = 20 / (20 + 180) = 10%	False omission rate (FOR) = FN / (FN + TN) = 10 / (10 + 1820) ≈ 0.55%	Positive likelihood ratio (LR+) = TPR/FPR = (20 / 30) / (180 / 2000) ≈ 7.41	Negative likelihood ratio (LR−) = FNR/TNR = (10 / 30) / (1820 / 2000) ≈ 0.366
		False discovery rate (FDR) = FP / (TP + FP) = 180 / (20 + 180) = 90.0%	Negative predictive value (NPV) = TN / (FN + TN) = 1820 / (10 + 1820) ≈ 99.45%	Diagnostic odds ratio (DOR) = (LR+)/(LR−) ≈ 20.2	

Related calculations

- False positive rate (α) = type I error = 1 − specificity = FP / (FP + TN) = 180 / (180 + 1820) = 9%
- False negative rate (β) = type II error = 1 − sensitivity = FN / (TP + FN) = 10 / (20 + 10) ≈ 33%
- Power = sensitivity = 1 − β
- Positive likelihood ratio = sensitivity / (1 − specificity) ≈ 0.67 / (1 − 0.91) ≈ 7.4
- Negative likelihood ratio = (1 − sensitivity) / specificity ≈ (1 − 0.67) / 0.91 ≈ 0.37
- Prevalence threshold = $PT = \frac{\sqrt{TPR(-TNR + 1)} + TNR - 1}{(TPR + TNR - 1)}$ ≈ 0.2686 ≈ 26.9%

This hypothetical screening test (fecal occult blood test) correctly identified two-thirds (66.7%) of patients with colorectal cancer. (Note: There are advantages and disadvantages for all medical screening tests. Clinical practice guidelines, such as those for colorectal cancer screening, describe these risks and benefits.) Unfortunately, factoring in prevalence rates reveals that this hypothetical test has a high false positive rate, and it does not reliably identify colorectal cancer in the overall population of asymptomatic people (PPV = 10%).

On the other hand, this hypothetical test demonstrates very accurate detection of cancer-free individuals (NPV ≈ 99.5%). Therefore, when used for routine colorectal cancer screening with asymptomatic adults, a negative result supplies important data for the patient and doctor, such as reassuring patients worried about developing colorectal cancer.

Confidence intervals for all the predictive parameters involved can be calculated, giving the range of values within which the true value lies at a given confidence level (e.g. 95%).

== Estimation of pre- and post-test probability ==
The likelihood ratio of a test provides a way to estimate the pre- and post-test probabilities of having a condition.

With pre-test probability and likelihood ratio given, then, the post-test probabilities can be calculated by the following three steps:

$$\text{pretest odds} = \frac{\text{pretest probability}}{1 - \text{pretest probability}}$$
$$\text{posttest odds} = \text{pretest odds} \times \text{likelihood ratio}$$

In equation above, positive post-test probability is calculated using the likelihood ratio positive, and the negative post-test probability is calculated using the likelihood ratio negative.

Odds are converted to probabilities as follows:

$$\begin{align}(1)\ \text{ odds} = \frac{\text{probability}}{1-\text{probability}}
\end{align}$$

multiply equation (1) by (1 − probability)

$$\begin{align}(2)\ \text{ probability} & = \text{odds} \times (1 - \text{probability}) \\
& = \text{odds} - \text{probability} \times \text{odds}
\end{align}$$

add (probability × odds) to equation (2)

$$\begin{align}(3)\ \text{ probability} + \text{probability} \times \text{odds} & = \text{odds} \\
\text{probability} \times (1 + \text{odds}) & = \text{odds}
\end{align}$$

divide equation (3) by (1 + odds)

$$\begin{align}(4)\ \text{ probability} = \frac{\text{odds}}{1 + \text{odds}}
\end{align}$$

hence

- Posttest probability = Posttest odds / (Posttest odds + 1)

Alternatively, post-test probability can be calculated directly from the pre-test probability and the likelihood ratio using the equation:

- P' = P0 × LR/(1 − P0 + P0×LR), where P0 is the pre-test probability, P' is the post-test probability, and LR is the likelihood ratio. This formula can be calculated algebraically by combining the steps in the preceding description.

In fact, post-test probability, as estimated from the likelihood ratio and pre-test probability, is generally more accurate than if estimated from the positive predictive value of the test, if the tested individual has a different pre-test probability than what is the prevalence of that condition in the population.

=== Example ===
Taking the medical example from above (20 true positives, 10 false negatives, and 2030 total patients), the positive pre-test probability is calculated as:

- Pretest probability = (20 + 10) / 2030 = 0.0148
- Pretest odds = 0.0148 / (1 − 0.0148) = 0.015
- Posttest odds = 0.015 × 7.4 = 0.111
- Posttest probability = 0.111 / (0.111 + 1) = 0.1 or 10%

As demonstrated, the positive post-test probability is numerically equal to the positive predictive value; the negative post-test probability is numerically equal to (1 − negative predictive value).
