= Gold standard (test) =

Diagnostic test or benchmark

In medicine and medical statistics, the gold standard, criterion standard, or reference standard is the diagnostic test or benchmark that is the best available under reasonable conditions. It is the test against which new tests are compared to gauge their validity, and it is used to evaluate the efficacy of treatments.

The meaning of "gold standard" may differ between practical medicine and the statistical ideal. With some medical conditions, only an autopsy can guarantee diagnostic certainty. In these cases, the gold standard test is the best test that keeps the patient alive, and even gold standard tests can require follow-up to confirm or refute the diagnosis.

== History ==
The term 'gold standard' in its current sense in medical research was coined by Rudd in 1979, in reference to the monetary gold standard.

== In medicine ==
"Gold standard" can refer to popular clinical endpoints by which scientific evidence is evaluated. For example, in resuscitation research, the "gold standard" test of a medication or procedure is whether or not it leads to an increase in the number of neurologically intact survivors that walk out of the hospital. Other types of medical research might regard a significant decrease in 30-day mortality as the gold standard.

The AMA Style Guide has preferred the phrase criterion standard instead of "gold standard." Other journals have also issued mandates in their instructions for contributors. For instance, the Archives of Biological Medicine and Rehabilitation specifies this usage. In practice, however, the uptake of this term by authors, as well as enforcement by editorial staff, is notably poor, at least for AMA journals.

When the criterion is a whole clinical testing procedure it is usually referred to as clinical case definition. Differing case definitions can produce wildly different results when used as the basis for evalulating a given diagnostic method.

== Application to diagnostic tests ==
A hypothetical ideal "gold standard" test has a sensitivity of 100% concerning the presence of the disease (it identifies all individuals with a well-defined disease process; it does not have any false-negative results) and a specificity of 100% (it does not falsely identify someone with a condition that does not have the condition; it does not have any false-positive results). In practice, there are no true gold standard tests.

Sometimes a test becomes popular and is declared to be the gold standard without adequate consideration of alternatives or despite weaknesses.

As new diagnostic methods become available, the "gold standard" test may change over time. For instance, for the diagnosis of aortic dissection, the gold standard test used to be the aortogram, which had a sensitivity as low as 83% and a specificity as low as 87%. Since the advancements of magnetic resonance imaging, the magnetic resonance angiogram (MRA) has become the new gold standard test for aortic dissection, with a sensitivity of 95% and a specificity of 92%. Before the widespread acceptance of any new test, the former test retains its status as the "gold standard".

== Test calibration ==
Because tests can be incorrect (yielding a false-negative or a false-positive), results should be interpreted in the context of the history, physical findings, and other test results of the individual being tested. It is within this context that the sensitivity and specificity of the "gold standard" test is determined.

When the gold standard is not a perfect one, its sensitivity and specificity must be calibrated against more accurate tests or against the definition of the condition. This calibration is especially important when a perfect test is available only by autopsy. A test has to meet some interobserver agreement, to avoid some bias induced by the study itself. Calibration errors can lead to misdiagnosis.

== Ambiguity ==
Sometimes "gold standard test" refers to the best-performing test available. In these cases, there is no other criterion against which it can be compared and it is equivalent to a definition. When referring to this meaning, gold standard tests are normally not performed at all. This is because the gold standard test may be difficult to perform or may be impossible to perform on a living person (i.e. the test is performed as part of an autopsy or may take too long for the results of the test to be available to be clinically useful).

Other times, the "gold standard" does not refer to the best-performing test available, but the best available under reasonable conditions. For example, in this sense, an MRI is the gold standard for brain tumor diagnosis, though it is not as good as a biopsy. In this case, the sensitivity and specificity of the gold standard are not 100% and it is said to be an "imperfect gold standard" or "alloyed gold standard".

The term ground truth refers to the underlying absolute state of information; the gold standard strives to represent the ground truth as closely as possible. While the gold standard is the best effort to obtain the truth, ground truth is typically collected by direct observations. In machine learning and information retrieval, "ground truth" is the preferred term even when classifications may be imperfect; the gold standard is assumed to be the ground truth.

Some authors use the term "golden standard". Claassen argues this usage is incorrect, as "golden standard" implies a level of perfection that is unattainable in medical science.

== See also ==
- Evidence-based medicine
- Statistical test
