= Fleiss =

Fleiss is a German surname meaning "diligence". Notable people with the surname include:

- Heidi Fleiss (born 1965), American madam
- Jennifer Fleiss, American fashion executive
- Joseph L. Fleiss (1937–2003), American biostatistician
- Laura Kaeppeler-Fleiss (born 1988), American beauty pageant winner
- Mike Fleiss (born 1964), American television producer
- Nika Fleiss (born 1984), Croatian skier
- Noah Fleiss (born 1984), American actor
- Paul M. Fleiss (1933–2014), American pediatrician

== See also ==
- Fleiss' kappa, a statistical measure of inter-rater reliability
