= Bangdiwala's B =

Measure of inter-rater agreement

Bangdiwala's B statistic was created by Shrikant Bangdiwala in 1985 and is a measure of inter-rater agreement. While not as commonly used as the kappa statistic the B test has been used by various workers. While it is principally used as a graphical aid to inter observer agreement, its asymptotic distribution is known.

== Definition ==
The test is applicable to testing the agreement between two observers. It is defined to be

$B = \frac{ \sum_{i=1}^k n_{ ii }^2 }{ \sum_{i=1}^k n_{ i. } n_{ .i } }$

where $n_{ii}$ are the values on the main diagonal, $n_{i.}$ is the $i$th row total, and $n_{.i}$ is the $i$th column total of the contingency table. The value of B varies in value between 0 (no agreement) and +1 (perfect agreement).

In large samples B has a normal distribution whose variance has a complicated expression. For small samples a permutation test is indicated.

Guidance on its use and its extension to n x n tables have been provided by Munoz & Bangdiwala. It may be more useful than the more commonly used Cohen's kappa in some circumstances.

== Tutorials and examples ==
Worked examples of the use of Bangdiwala's B have been published. The statistical programming language R has a set of functions that will compute the B test, and a tutorial on the use of a test using these R functions is available.

== See also ==
- Cohen's kappa
- Fleiss' kappa
- Scott's Pi
