= W. A. Scott =

W. A. Scott may refer to:

- Walter A. Scott (1876–1963), mayor of Jackson, Mississippi
- William A. Scott (psychologist) (1926–1991), American-born social psychologist
- William Alexander Scott (born 1940), politician in Bermuda
- William Alphonsus Scott (1871–1921), Irish Roman Catholic architectural historian
- William Amasa Scott (1862–1944), American economist
- William Anderson Scott (1813–1885), Presbyterian minister, author, and educator
