= Intra-rater reliability =

Statistics concept

In statistics, intra-rater reliability is the degree of agreement among repeated administrations of a diagnostic test performed by a single rater. Intra-rater reliability and inter-rater reliability are aspects of test validity.

== See also ==
- Inter-rater reliability
- Rating (pharmaceutical industry)
- Reliability (statistics)
- Repeatability
- Test-retest reliability
