= Joseph L. Fleiss =

American mathematician (1937–2003)

- Born: November 13, 1937; Brooklyn, New York, US
- Died: June 12, 2003 (aged 65); Ridgewood, New Jersey, US
- Education: Columbia University
- Known for: mental health statistics development of Fleiss' kappa
- Scientific career
- Fields: Biostatistics
- Workplaces: Columbia University
- Thesis: Analysis of variance methods in assessing errors in interview data (1967)
- Doctoral advisor: Theodore Wilbur Anderson

Joseph Leon Fleiss (November 13, 1937 – June 12, 2003) was an American professor of biostatistics at the Columbia University Mailman School of Public Health, where he also served as head of the Division of Biostatistics from 1975 to 1992. He is known for his work in mental health statistics, particularly assessing the reliability of diagnostic classifications, and the measures, models, and control of errors in categorization.

== Early life and education ==
Fleiss was born in Brooklyn, New York. He attended Columbia College of Columbia University and was awarded a bachelor's degree cum laude in 1959. In 1960 he attended a program in biostatistics at the University of Minnesota, then returned to Columbia University, where he earned an M.S. in biostatistics in 1961 from the School of Public Health (now called the Mailman School of Public Health), and a Ph.D. in statistics in 1967 from the Department of Mathematical Statistics in the Columbia Graduate School of Arts and Sciences.

== Career ==
While still a college student, Fleiss began his career at the Biometrics Research Unit of the New York State Psychiatric Institute, first as a statistical clerk and later as a research scientist and biostatistician. He was affiliated with the Psychiatric Institute until 1986.

In 1975, Columbia University recruited Fleiss to be a professor and head of the Division of Biostatistics at the School of Public Health. He remained in that capacity until 1992. Under his leadership, the Division increased in size and stature. Fleiss transformed the Division from a small program consisting chiefly of New Yorkers into a department with international prestige. He instituted a Ph.D. program in 1977. He recruited top faculty from major institutions around the world. The Division trained students, performed independent research, and supported clinical research associated with Columbia University's health sciences divisions.

== Field of expertise ==
One of Fleiss's chief concerns was mental health statistics, particularly assessing the reliability of diagnostic classifications, and the measures, models, and control of errors in categorization. He was among the first to notice the equivalence of weighted kappa and the intraclass correlation coefficient as measures of reliability in categorical data (see Fleiss' kappa).

In an influential 1974 paper co-authored with Robert Spitzer, Fleiss demonstrated that the second edition of the American Psychiatric Association's Diagnostic and Statistical Manual of Mental Disorders (DSM-II) was an unreliable diagnostic tool. They found that different practitioners using the DSM-II were rarely in agreement when diagnosing patients with similar problems. In reviewing previous studies of 18 major diagnostic categories, Fleiss and Spitzer concluded that "there are no diagnostic categories for which reliability is uniformly high. Reliability appears to be only satisfactory for three categories: mental deficiency, organic brain syndrome (but not its subtypes), and alcoholism. The level of reliability is no better than fair for psychosis and schizophrenia and is poor for the remaining categories."

== Publications ==
Fleiss wrote two textbooks that are considered classics in biostatistics. His first book, Statistical Methods for Rates and Proportions (1973), concerned the issue of using proportions to summarize counts and frequencies. According to professors Patrick E. Shrout and Melissa D. Begg, the book "attracted a wide readership with its many engaging examples and a thorough, but accessible discussion of esoteric statistical principles". It continues to be particularly influential in the fields of psychiatry and epidemiology.

Fleiss's second book, Design and Analysis of Clinical Experiments (1986), was equally influential among a different group of medical researchers. It reviewed the principles and challenges concerning the planning and interpretation of studies involving people. Human subjects present experimenters with challenges not seen in other scientific experiments: they may fail to take the treatment, they may drop out of a study, and they may lie or misrepresent the outcome. In his book, Fleiss addressed these problems.

Fleiss also contributed chapters to more than two dozen books and authored or co-authored more than 200 statistical and scientific papers concerning the application of statistics in fields ranging from psychiatry and cardiology to dentistry.

== Recognition and awards ==
Because of the high reputation he enjoyed in the field of biostatistics, Fleiss was asked to participate in a large number of scientific panels and review groups for the U.S. Food and Drug Administration and the National Institutes of Health. He reviewed papers for several academic journals and from 1975 to 1984, he served as an associate editor for Biometrics. Fleiss was elected president of the Eastern North American Region of the International Biometric Society in 1986.

Fleiss was elected a Fellow of the American Statistical Association in 1973. That year he was also given the Mortimer Spiegelman Health Statistics Award by the American Public Health Association. In 1998, the Harvard Institute of Psychiatric Epidemiology and Genetics recognized Fleiss with a Lifetime Contribution Award for his contributions to psychiatric epidemiology and biostatistics.

== Death ==
Fleiss suffered from Lewy-body Disease, which led to his retirement as department head in 1992, when he was 55 years old. By the age of 58, he was no longer able to work. He died in 2003.

== Bibliography ==
=== Books ===
- Fleiss, J. L. (1973). Statistical Methods for Rates and Proportions. New York: John Wiley & Sons.
- Fleiss, J. L. (1986). Design and Analysis of Clinical Experiments. New York: John Wiley & Sons.
- Fleiss, J. L.; Levin, B.; Paik, M.C. (2003). Statistical Methods for Rates and Proportions (3rd ed.). New York: John Wiley & Sons.

=== Selected papers ===
- Spitzer, R., Cohen, J., Fleiss, J. L., and Endicott, J. (1967). "Quantification of agreement in psychiatric diagnosis". Archives of General Psychiatry. 17 (1): 83–87. doi:10.1001/archpsyc.1967.01730250085012. PMID 4952165.
- Fleiss, J. L. (1971). "Measuring nominal scale agreement among many raters". Psychological Bulletin. 76 (5): 378–382. doi:10.1037/h0031619.
- Spitzer, R., and Fleiss, J. L. (1974). "A re-analysis of the reliability of psychiatric diagnosis". British Journal of Psychiatry. 125 (587): 341–347. doi:10.1192/bjp.125.4.341. PMID 4425771. S2CID 37782257.
- Shrout, P. E.; Fleiss, J. L. (1979). "Intraclass correlations: Uses in assessing rater reliability". Psychological Bulletin. 86 (2): 420–428. doi:10.1037/0033-2909.86.2.420. PMID 18839484. S2CID 13168820.

== See also ==
- Fleiss' kappa
- Cohen's kappa
