= Markedness =

State of standing out as unusual

In linguistics and social sciences, markedness is the state of standing out as nontypical or divergent as opposed to regular or common. The typical form or meaning of a term is said to be unmarked versus the nontypical marked form or meaning.

In linguistics, markedness involves the characterization of a "normal" linguistic unit against one or more of its possible "irregular" forms. Markedness can apply to phonological, grammatical, and semantic oppositions, such as honest (unmarked) as opposed to dishonest (marked). The term derives from the marking of a grammatical role with a suffix or other element, but has been extended to semantic distinctions where there is no morphological difference.

In social sciences more broadly, markedness is used to distinguish two meanings of the same term, where one is common usage (unmarked sense) and the other is specialized to a certain cultural context (marked sense).

In psychology, the social science concept of markedness is quantified as a measure of how much one variable is marked as a predictor or possible cause of another, and is also known as Δp (deltaP) in simple two-choice cases. See confusion matrix for more details.

== Marked and unmarked word pairs ==
Among lexical opposites, a marked form is a non-basic one, often one with inflectional or derivational endings. Thus, a morphologically negative word form is marked as opposed to a positive one: happy/unhappy, honest/dishonest, fair/unfair, clean/unclean, and so forth. Similarly, unaffixed masculine or singular forms are taken to be unmarked in contrast to affixed feminine or plural forms: lion/lioness, host/hostess, automobile/automobiles, child/children. An unmarked form is also a default form. For example, the unmarked lion can refer to a male or female, while lioness is marked because it can refer only to females.

The default nature allows unmarked lexical forms to be identified even when the opposites are not morphologically related. In the pairs old/young, big/little, happy/sad, clean/dirty, the first term of each pair is taken as unmarked because it occurs generally in questions. For example, English speakers typically ask how old someone is; use of the marked term (how young are you?) would presuppose youth.

== Background in Prague School ==
While the idea of linguistic asymmetry predated the actual coining of the terms marked and unmarked, the modern concept of markedness originated in the Prague School structuralism of Roman Jakobson and Nikolai Trubetzkoy as a means of characterizing binary oppositions.

Both sound and meaning were analyzed into systems of binary distinctive features. Edwin Battistella wrote: "Binarism suggests symmetry and equivalence in linguistic analysis; markedness adds the idea of hierarchy." Trubetzkoy and Jakobson analyzed phonological oppositions such as nasal versus non-nasal as defined as the presence versus the absence of nasality; the presence of the feature, nasality, was marked; its absence, non-nasality, was unmarked. For Jakobson and Trubetzkoy, binary phonological features formed part of a universal feature alphabet applicable to all languages. In his 1932 article "Structure of the Russian Verb", Jakobson extended the concept to grammatical meanings in which the marked element "announces the existence of [some meaning] A" while the unmarked element "does not announce the existence of A, i.e., does not state whether A is present or not". Forty years later, Jakobson described language by saying that "every single constituent of a linguistic system is built on an opposition of two logical contradictories: the presence of an attribute ('markedness') in contraposition to its absence ('unmarkedness')."

In his 1941 Child Language, Aphasia, and Universals of Language, Jakobson suggested that phonological markedness played a role in language acquisition and loss. Drawing on existing studies of acquisition and aphasia, Jakobson suggested a mirror-image relationship determined by a universal feature hierarchy of marked and unmarked oppositions. Today many still see Jakobson's theory of phonological acquisition as identifying useful tendencies.

== Jakobsonian tradition ==
The work of Cornelius van Schooneveld, Edna Andrews, Rodney Sangster, Yishai Tobin and others on 'semantic invariance' (different general meanings reflected in the contextual specific meanings of features) has further developed the semantic analysis of grammatical items in terms of marked and unmarked features. Other semiotically-oriented work has investigated the isomorphism of form and meaning with less emphasis on invariance, including the efforts of Henning Andersen, Michael Shapiro, and Edwin Battistella. Shapiro and Andrews have especially made connections between the semiotic of C. S. Peirce and markedness, treating it "as species of interpretant" in Peirce's sign–object–interpretant triad.

Functional linguists such as Talmy Givón have suggested that markedness is related to cognitive complexity—"in terms of attention, mental effort or processing time". Linguistic 'naturalists' view markedness relations in terms of the ways in which extralinguistic principles of perceptibility and psychological efficiency determine what is natural in language. Willi Mayerthaler, another linguist, for example, defines unmarked categories as those "in agreement with the typical attributes of the speaker".

== Cultural markedness and informedness ==
Since a main component of markedness is the information content and information value of an element, some studies have taken markedness as an encoding of that which is unusual or informative, and this is reflected in formal probabilistic definitions of markedness and informedness that, for dichotomous problems, correspond to the chance-correct unidirectional components of the Matthews correlation coefficient known as Δp and Δp'. Conceptual familiarity with cultural norms provided by familiar categories creates a ground against which marked categories provide a figure, opening the way for markedness to be applied to cultural and social categorization.

As early as the 1930s Jakobson had already suggested applying markedness to all oppositions, explicitly mentioning such pairs as life/death, liberty/bondage, sin/virtue, and holiday/working day. Linda Waugh extended this to oppositions like male/female, white/black, sighted/blind, hearing/deaf, heterosexual/homosexual, right/left, fertility/barrenness, clothed/nude, and spoken language/written language. Battistella expanded this with the demonstration of how cultures align markedness values to create cohesive symbol systems, illustrating with examples based on Rodney Needham's work. Other work has applied markedness to stylistics, music, and myth.

== Local markedness and markedness reversals ==
Markedness depends on context. What is more marked in some general contexts may be less marked in other local contexts. Thus, "ant" is less marked than "ants" on the morphological level, but on the semantic (and frequency) levels it may be more marked since ants are more often encountered many at once than one at a time. Often a more general markedness relation may be reversed in a particular context. Thus, voicelessness of consonants is typically unmarked. But between vowels or in the neighborhood of voiced consonants, voicing may be the expected or unmarked value.

Reversal is reflected in certain West Frisian words' plural and singular forms: In West Frisian, nouns with irregular singular-plural stem variations are undergoing regularization. Usually this means that the plural is reformed to be a regular form of the singular:

- Old paradigm: "koal" (coal), "kwallen" (coals) → regularized forms: "Koal" (coal), "Koalen" (coals).

However, a number of words instead reform the singular by extending the form of the plural:

- Old paradigm: "earm" (arm), "jermen" (arms) → regularized forms: "jerm" (arm), "jermen" (arms)

The common feature of the nouns that regularize the singular to match the plural is that they occur more often in pairs or groups than singly; they are said to be semantically (but not morphologically) locally unmarked in the plural.

== Universals and frequency ==
Joseph Greenberg's 1966 book Language Universals was an influential application of markedness to typological linguistics and a break from the tradition of Jakobson and Trubetzkoy. Greenberg took frequency to be the primary determining factor of markedness in grammar and suggested that unmarked categories could be determined by "the frequency of association of things in the real world".

Greenberg also applied frequency cross-linguistically, suggesting that unmarked categories would be those that are unmarked in a wide number of languages. However, critics have argued that frequency is problematic because categories that are cross-linguistically infrequent may have a high distribution in a particular language.

More recently the insights related to frequency have been formalized as chance-corrected conditional probabilities, with Informedness (Δp') and Markedness (Δp) corresponding to the different directions of prediction in human association research (binary associations or distinctions) and more generally (including features with more than two distinctions).

Universals have also been connected to implicational laws. This entails that a category is taken as marked if every language that has the marked category also has the unmarked one but not vice versa.

== Diagnostics ==
Markedness has been extended and reshaped over the past century and reflects a range of loosely connected theoretical approaches. From emerging in the analysis of binary oppositions, it has become a global semiotic principle, a means of encoding naturalness and language universals, and a terminology for studying defaults and preferences in language acquisition. What connects various approaches is a concern for the evaluation of linguistic structure, though the details of how markedness is determined and what its implications and diagnostics are varies widely. Other approaches to universal markedness relations focus on functional economic and iconic motivations, tying recurring symmetries to properties of communication channels and communication events. Croft (1990), for example, notes that asymmetries among linguistic elements may be explainable in terms economy of form, in terms of iconism between the structure of language and conceptualization of the world.

== In generative grammar ==
Markedness entered generative linguistic theory through Noam Chomsky and Morris Halle's The Sound Pattern of English. For Chomsky and Halle, phonological features went beyond a universal phonetic vocabulary to encompass an 'evaluation metric', a means of selecting the most highly valued adequate grammar. In The Sound Pattern of English, the value of a grammar was the inverse of the number of features required in that grammar. However, Chomsky and Halle realized that their initial approach to phonological features made implausible rules and segment inventories as highly valued as natural ones. The unmarked value of a feature was cost-free with respect to the evaluation metric, while the marked feature values were counted by the metric. Segment inventories could also be evaluated according to the number of marked features. However, the use of phonological markedness as part of the evaluation metric was never able to fully account for the fact that some features are more likely than others or for the fact that phonological systems must have a certain minimal complexity and symmetry.

In generative syntax, markedness as feature-evaluation did not receive the same attention that it did in phonology. Chomsky came to view unmarked properties as an innate preference structure based first in constraints and later in parameters of universal grammar. In their 1977 article "Filters and Control", Chomsky and Howard Lasnik extended this to view markedness as part of a theory of 'core grammar':

We will assume that [Universal Grammar] is not an 'undifferentiated' system, but rather incorporates something analogous to a 'theory of markedness.' Specifically, there is a theory of core grammar with highly restricted options, limited expressive power, and a few parameters. Systems that fall within core grammar constitute 'the unmarked case'; we may think of them as optimal in terms of the evaluation metric. An actual language is determined by fixing the parameters of core grammar and then adding rules or conditions, using much richer resources, ... These added properties of grammars we may think of as the syntactic analogue of irregular verbs.

A few years later, Chomsky describes it thus:

The distinction between core and periphery leaves us with three notions of markedness: core versus periphery, internal to the core, and internal to the periphery. The second has to do with the way parameters are set in the absence of evidence. As for the third, there are, no doubt, significant regularities even in departures from the core principles (for example, in irregular verb morphology in English), and it may be that peripheral constructions are related to the core in systematic ways, say by relaxing certain conditions of core grammar.

Some generative researchers have applied markedness to second-language acquisition theory, treating it as an inherent learning hierarchy which reflects the sequence in which constructions are acquired, the difficulty of acquiring certain constructions, and the transferability of rules across languages. More recently, optimality theory approaches emerging in the 1990s have incorporated markedness in the ranking of constraints.

== See also ==
- Inflection
- Lemma (morphology)
- Lexeme
- Male as norm
- Marker (linguistics)
- Matthews correlation coefficient
- Null morpheme
- Other (philosophy)
- Underlying representation
