= Concordance correlation coefficient =

In statistics, a measurement of the agreement between two variables

In statistics, the concordance correlation coefficient measures the agreement between two variables, e.g., to evaluate reproducibility or for inter-rater reliability.

== Definition ==
The form of the concordance correlation coefficient $\rho_c$ as

$$\rho_c = \frac{2\rho\sigma_x\sigma_y}{\sigma_x^2 + \sigma_y^2 + (\mu_x - \mu_y)^2},$$

where $\mu_x$ and $\mu_y$ are the means for the two variables and $\sigma^2_x$ and $\sigma^2_y$ are the corresponding variances. $\rho$ is Pearson's correlation coefficient between the two variables.

This follows from its definition, as:

$$\rho_c = 1 - \frac{{\rm Expected\ orthogonal\ squared\ distance\ from\ the\ diagonal\ }x=y}
{{\rm Expected\ orthogonal\ squared\ distance\ from\ the\ diagonal\ }x=y{\rm \ assuming\ independence}}.$$

When the concordance correlation coefficient is computed on a length-$N$ data set (i.e., $N$ paired values $(x_n, y_n)$, for $n=1,...,N$), the form is

$$\hat{\rho}_c = \frac{2 s_{xy}}{s_x^2 + s_y^2 + (\bar{x} - \bar{y})^2},$$

where the mean is computed as

$$\bar{x} = \frac{1}{N} \sum_{n=1}^N x_n$$

and the variance

$$s_x^2 = \frac{1}{N} \sum_{n=1}^N (x_n - \bar{x})^2$$

and the covariance

$$s_{xy} = \frac{1}{N} \sum_{n=1}^N (x_n - \bar{x})(y_n - \bar{y}) .$$

Whereas the ordinary correlation coefficient (Pearson's) is immune to whether the biased or unbiased versions for estimation of the variance is used, the concordance correlation coefficient is not. In the original article, Lin suggested normalizing with $1/N$ normalization, while in another article Nickerson appears to have used $1/(N-1)$, i.e., the concordance correlation coefficient may be computed slightly differently between implementations.

== Relation to other measures of correlation ==
The concordance correlation coefficient is nearly identical to some of the measures called intra-class correlations. Comparisons of the concordance correlation coefficient with an "ordinary" intraclass correlation on different data sets found only small differences between the two correlations, in one case on the third decimal. It has also been stated that the ideas for concordance correlation coefficient "are quite similar to results already published by Krippendorff in 1970".

In the original article Lin suggested a form for multiple classes (not just 2). Over ten years later a correction to this form was issued.

One example of the use of the concordance correlation coefficient is in a comparison of analysis method for functional magnetic resonance imaging brain scans.
