= Rating (clinical trials) =

Evaluation method used in pharmaceutical industry

Within the field of clinical trials, rating is the process by which a human evaluator subjectively judges the response of a patient to a medical treatment. The rating can include more than one treatment response. The assessor is normally an independent observer other than the patient, but the assessor can also be the patient (a patient-reported outcome). Furthermore, some clinical outcomes can only be assessed by the patient (a "private phenomenon").

Because the evaluation is subjective, this can result in both inter-rater or intra-rater reliability. When conducting clinical trials, ensuring rating consistency is important, but can prove to be quite difficult to obtain. Studies dealing with such indications as pain, mental disease or mood are not able to easily track progress with physical or physiological testing, rather, verbal subjective human testing is used. This can allow for an array of differences in rating.

Blinded assessors who are not told which treatment group a patient belongs to have a significantly lower observer bias compared to non-blinded assessors.

Rater training is sometimes used in an attempt to lower rater variability.
