= William A. Scott (psychologist) =

American social psychologist

William A. Scott (1926–1991) was an American-born social psychologist.

Scott served in the United States Navy at the Navy Oriental Language School in Stillwater, Oklahoma following World War II. He then worked as a civilian for the United States Army Military Government for three years during the Occupation of Japan.

Following his work for the Army, he then did graduate study in psychology at the University of Michigan, where he did research on propaganda and attitudes. From 1955, he held an academic appointment at the University of Colorado Boulder, where he eventually became a full professor. While there, he made contributions to research on mental health and cognitive complexity, and to value theory. In 1974 he migrated to Australia, becoming the Foundation Professor of Behavioural Science at James Cook University in Townsville. In 1977, he took a position as Professor of Psychology at the Australian National University in Canberra. During this period, he did research on cognitive structure and on the adaptation of immigrants, the latter in collaboration with his wife Ruth Scott. He was elected a Fellow of the Academy of Social Sciences in Australia in 1977. He died in Canberra on 8 November 1991.

A notable contribution of William Scott was the development of the Scott's pi as a measure of inter-observer agreement for nominal scale measures. Scott's paper on pi has been recognized as a citation classic.
