= ROCC =

ROCC may refer to:

- Roll-On Conference Capsule (ROCC), United States Air Force Life Cycle Management Center mobile command center
- Rolling Operations Command Center, a fictional device in G.I. Joe: Sigma 6
- Receiver operating characteristic curve
  - Receiver Operating Characteristic Curve Explorer and Tester (ROCCET)
