= Area under the curve (disambiguation) =

Area under the curve is a common application of definite integrals.

It may also refer to:

- Area under the curve (pharmacokinetics), a pharmacology integral
- Receiver operating characteristic#Area under the curve, a statistical concept
