= The Man Who Saved the World =

2013 film by Peter Anthony

- Cinema poster
- Directed by: Peter Anthony
- Written by: Peter Anthony
- Produced by: Jakob Staberg
- Starring: Stanislav Petrov; Galina Kalinina; Sergey Shnyryov; Kevin Costner
- Cinematography: Kim Hattesen; Anders Löfstedt
- Edited by: Morten Højbjerg
- Music by: Kristian Eidnes Andersen
- Production companies: Statement Film; Light Cone Pictures; Studio Mao (in association with)
- Distributed by: Syndicado
- Release date: 27 April 2013 (Hot Docs)
- Running time: 110 minutes
- Country: Denmark
- Languages: English; Russian

The Man Who Saved the World is a 2013 feature-length Danish documentary film by filmmaker Peter Anthony about Stanislav Petrov, a former lieutenant colonel of the Soviet Air Defence Forces and his role in preventing the 1983 Soviet nuclear false alarm incident from leading to nuclear holocaust.

The film premiered in October 2014 at the Woodstock Film Festival in Woodstock, New York, winning; "Honorable Mention: Audience Award Winner for Best Narrative Feature" and "Honorable Mention: James Lyons Award for Best Editing of a Narrative Feature." On 22 February 2018 the film premiered in Russia at the Documentary Film Center in Moscow.

== Synopsis ==
On 26 September 1983, the computers in the Serpukhov-15 bunker outside Moscow, which housed the command centre of the Soviet early warning satellite system, twice reported that U.S. intercontinental ballistic missiles were heading toward the Soviet Union. Stanislav Petrov, who was duty officer that night, suspected that the system was malfunctioning and managed to convince his superiors of the same thing. He argued that if the U.S. was going to attack pre-emptively it would do so with more than just five missiles, and that it was best to wait for ground radar confirmation before launching a counter-attack.

The documentary features Petrov's 2006 trip to the US with interpreter Galina. On the trip, Petrov visits the UN, meets, among others, Kevin Costner and visits the Minuteman Missile National Historic Site.

== Production notes ==
In the film, footage of Petrov today is intertwined with re-enactments of the dramatic moments in 1983. Sergey Shnyryov plays Petrov in the re-enactments.

Peter Anthony made the film over a decade; the process was difficult because of Petrov's reluctance to open up. Anthony said: "He is quite difficult to work with, as in his day, you could still go to the gulag for disclosing unauthorised information, and as an ex-soldier, he wasn't really interested in discussing his personal feelings. That though is the beauty of the story."

== Awards ==
=== 2013 ===
Hot Docs Canadian International Documentary Festival

- Nominated, Best International Documentary

=== 2014 ===
CPH:DOX

- Nominated, Politiken's Audience Award
- Nominated, Nordic Dox Award

Woodstock Film Festival

- Won, Honorable Mention: Audience Award for Best Narrative Feature
- Won, Honorable Mention: James Lyons Award for Best Editing of a Narrative Feature
- Nominated, Jury Prize: Best Narrative Feature

=== 2015 ===
Nordisk Panorama

- Nominated, Nordic Documentary Film Award

Sunscreen Film Festival, US

- Won, Festival Prize: Best Feature Film

=== 2016 ===
Robert Awards (Danish Film Academy Award)

- Won the Robert Award for Best Documentary Feature
- Nominated for the Robert Award for Best Score
- Nominated for the Robert Audience Award

Bodil Awards (Danish Film Critics Award)

- Won the Bodil Award for Best Documentary

== See also ==
- Vasily Arkhipov, a Soviet Naval officer who refused to launch a nuclear torpedo during the 1962 Cuban Missile Crisis
- List of nuclear close calls
