= John A. Swets =

American psychologist

John Arthur Swets
- Born: June 19, 1928; Grand Rapids, Michigan
- Died: 6 July 2016 (aged 88)
- Known for: Signal detection theory Receiver Operating Characteristic
- Awards: Howard Crosby Warren Medal (1985), with David M. Green; APA Distinguished Scientific Contribution Award (1990)
- Scientific career
- Fields: Psychology
- Institutions: Massachusetts Institute of Technology; BBN Technologies

John A. Swets (19 June 1928 – 6 July 2016) was an American psychologist. He played a key role in the adaptation of signal detection theory first to the psychology of perception and later as a central tool in medical diagnostics. He was a member of the National Academy of Sciences.
