= DET =

DET or Det may refer to:

== Education ==
- Department of Education (New South Wales), formerly Department of Education and Training
- Duolingo English Test (DET), a standardized language test

== Mathematics ==
- Detection error tradeoff
- det, mathematical notation for the determinant of a matrix

== Places ==
- Detroit, Michigan, United States
- Detroit (Amtrak station)
- Coleman A. Young International Airport, Detroit (IATA:DET)

== Sport ==
- Sports in Detroit, US
  - Detroit Lions, National Football League
  - Detroit Pistons, National Basketball Association
  - Detroit Tigers, Major League Baseball
  - Detroit Red Wings, National Hockey League

== Other uses ==
- Dafydd Elis-Thomas (1946-2025), Welsh politician
- Determiner, in interlinear glossing
- Diethyltryptamine, a psychedelic drug
- It (poetry collection), 1969, by Inger Christensen (Danish: Det)
- 14 Intelligence Company "The Det", a British undercover military unit
- Disney Entertainment Television, the TV broadcasting division of The Walt Disney Company
