= TOC =

TOC, toc, Toc, or ToC may refer to:

== Documents ==
- Table of contents, at the beginning of a book or document

== Organizations ==
- Transnational organized crime
- Thomson Corporation, by ticker symbol on the New York and Toronto Stock Exchanges
- The Objectivist Center, part of The Atlas Society
- Tactical operations center, for police, paramilitary, or military operations
- Taste of Chaos, a winter/spring concert series
- Tournament of Champions (debate), a high school debate tournament
- Train operating company in the UK
- Town of Cambridge Perth, Western Australia
- The Online Citizen, a Singaporean blogging platform

== Places ==
- Monte Toc, Italy, site of a major landslide
- Toc, a village in Săvârșin Commune, Arad County, Romania
- Town Centre stop, a Light Rail stop in Hong Kong, by MTR station code

== Science and technology ==
- TOC protocol, an instant message communications protocol
- Translocon at the outer membrane of chloroplast, in beta barrel
- Total organic carbon in an organic compound
- TOC1 (gene), a gene that regulates circadian rhythm in plants
- Theory of computation in computer science
- Transmission oil cooler, a secondary function (or specialized type) of radiator (engine cooling)

== Mathematics ==
- Total operating characteristic, a statistical method to compare a Boolean variable and a rank variable

== Other ==
- "T", in the World War I Western Front "signalese" and the RAF phonetic alphabet
- Teacher on call, a substitute teacher
- Theory of constraints, a management paradigm
- Theory of change, a methodology to promote social change
- Top of climb, in aviation

== See also ==
- TCO (disambiguation)
- ToC (disambiguation)
