= ToC =

ToC may refer to:

- Troponin C, a protein component
- Theory of Computing, a scientific journal

== See also ==
- TOC (disambiguation)
