= Yuri Votintsev =

Yuriy Vsyevolodovich Votintsev
- Юрий Всеволодович Вотинцев
- Born: October 23, 1919; Tashkent, Turkestan ASSR, Russian SFSR (now Uzbekistan)
- Died: November 29, 2005 (aged 86); Moscow, Russia
- Military career
- Allegiance: Soviet Union
- Branch: Soviet Air Defence Forces
- Service years: 1936–1986
- Rank: Colonel general
- Commands: Soviet Air Defense's Missile Defense Units
- Awards: Order of Lenin; Order of the Red Banner; Order of Alexander Nevsky, 1st-degree; Orders of the Patriotic War; Red Star Order; Emblem of Honor

Colonel General Yuriy Vsyevolodovich Votintsev (Russian: Юрий Всеволодович Вотинцев; 23 October 1919 – 29 November 2005) was a commander of the Soviet Air Defense's Missile Defense Units. He is best known for the revelation in his memoirs in 1998 of the 1983 incident involving Stanislav Petrov in which the latter probably prevented an inadvertent nuclear war between the United States and the former Soviet Union.

== Biography ==
He was born October 23, 1919, in Tashkent, Uzbekistan, to Vsyevolod Dimitrievich and Anastasia Alexandrovna (Shcheglova) Votintsev. He married Anna Makarovna (Rysakova) Votintsev (b. 1919), with a son, Vsyevolod Yurievich Votintsev (b. 1956), who worked as a military journalist, and a daughter, Marina Yuryevna Votintseva (b. 1959), a military foreign linguist.

== Career ==
Votintsev was a promoted and repeatedly decorated artillery officer throughout World War II. Toward 1953 he was lending his experience to North Korean and Chinese forces during the Korean War. He went on to serve in antiaircraft and space defense, becoming an artillery Major General in 1958 and transferring to Turkmenistan, working with southern border defense to suppress American U-2 surveillance flights. He became a lieutenant general in 1963 and a Turkmen delegate to the 22nd and 23rd CPSU Party Congresses. He headed interdepartmental technical commissions and was made a Hero of Soviet Labor by the Supreme Soviet of the Soviet Union, as well as given an Order of Lenin and Hammer and Sickle gold medal at the hand of Dimitri Ustinov. After retirement he was the veteran's organization chair for the capital's Oktyabrskiy region and was chosen as a delegate to the 1990 28th Congress of the CPSU. He holds two Orders of Lenin, four Orders of the Red Banner, an Order of Alexander Nevsky, and two first-degree Orders of the Patriotic War (World War II), Red Star Orders, and Emblem of Honor (Znak Pochyota) medals.

Votintsev resided in Moscow.
