= TCO =

TCO may refer to:

== Organisations ==
- Tallinn Chamber Orchestra, an Estonian orchestra
- Swedish Confederation of Professional Employees (Tjänstemännens Centralorganisation), a Swedish confederation of trade unions
- Tengizchevroil
- Topcoder Open, an event by Topcoder
- The Cinematic Orchestra, a British-based jazz and electronic music group

== Science and technology ==
- Tail call optimization, a computer programming concept
- TCO watchdog, a hardware watchdog timer nearly all desktop and server computers have
- Transparent conducting oxide, a type of transparent conducting film in electronics
- Thermal cutoff, a type of electronic protection component
- Temporarily captured orbiter, a temporary natural satellite
- TCO Certified, a specification for safety and sustainability of electronical products

== Other ==
- TCO, the IATA code for La Florida Airport (Colombia)
- Total cost of ownership, a method of cost analysis
- Temporary certificate of occupancy
- Tactical Control Officer, see MIM-104 Patriot
- Native Community Lands (Tierras Comunitarias de Origen), Bolivian collectively titled indigenous territories
- Transnational Criminal Organization, see Transnational crime
- Taipei Chinese Orchestra, an orchestra in Taiwan

== See also ==
- TOC (disambiguation)
