= Sensitivity index =

Statistic used in signal detection theory

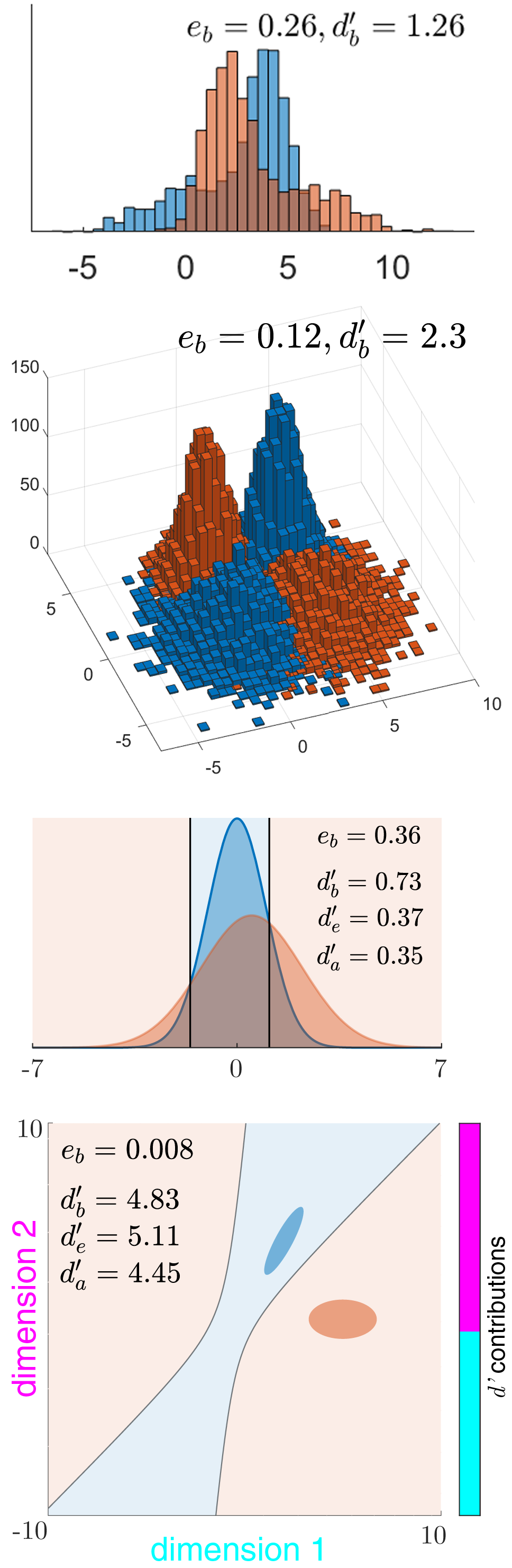
Figure 1: Bayes-optimal classification error probability $e_b$ and Bayes discriminability index $d'_b$ between two univariate histograms computed from their overlap area. Figure 2: Same computed from the overlap volume of two bivariate histograms. Figure 3: discriminability indices of two univariate normal distributions with unequal variances. The classification boundary is in black. Figure 4: discriminability indices of two bivariate normal distributions with unequal covariance matrices (ellipses are 1 sd error ellipses). Color-bar shows the relative contribution to the discriminability by each dimension.

The sensitivity index or discriminability index or detectability index is a dimensionless statistic used in signal detection theory. A higher index indicates that the signal can be more readily detected.

== Definition ==
The discriminability index is the separation between the means of two distributions (typically the signal and the noise distributions), in units of the standard deviation.

=== Equal variances/covariances ===
For two univariate distributions $a$ and $b$ with the same standard deviation, it is denoted by $d'$ ('dee-prime'):

$$d' = \frac{\left\vert \mu_a - \mu_b \right\vert}{\sigma}$$.

In higher dimensions, i.e. with two multivariate distributions with the same variance-covariance matrix $\mathbf{\Sigma}$, (whose symmetric square-root, the standard deviation matrix, is $\mathbf{S}$), this generalizes to the Mahalanobis distance between the two distributions:

$$d'=\sqrt{(\boldsymbol{\mu}_a-\boldsymbol{\mu}_b)'\mathbf{\Sigma}^{-1}(\boldsymbol{\mu}_a-\boldsymbol{\mu}_b)} = \lVert \mathbf{S}^{-1}(\boldsymbol{\mu}_a-\boldsymbol{\mu}_b) \rVert = \lVert \boldsymbol{\mu}_a-\boldsymbol{\mu}_b \rVert /\sigma_{\boldsymbol{\mu}}$$,

where $\sigma_{\boldsymbol{\mu}} = 1/ \lVert\mathbf{S}^{-1}\boldsymbol{\mu}\rVert$ is the 1d slice of the sd along the unit vector $\boldsymbol{\mu}$ through the means, i.e. the $d'$ equals the $d'$ along the 1d slice through the means.

For two bivariate distributions with equal variance-covariance, this is given by:

$${d'}^2 =\frac{1}{1-\rho^2} \left({d'}^2_x+{d'}^2_y-2\rho {d'}_x {d'}_y \right)$$,

where $\rho$ is the correlation coefficient, and here $d'_x=\frac{{\mu_b}_x-{\mu_a}_x}{\sigma_x}$ and $d'_y=\frac{{\mu_b}_y-{\mu_a}_y}{\sigma_y}$, i.e. including the signs of the mean differences instead of the absolute.

$d'$ is also estimated as $Z(\text{hit rate})-Z(\text{false alarm rate})$.

=== Unequal variances/covariances ===
When the two distributions have different standard deviations (or in general dimensions, different covariance matrices), there exist several contending indices, all of which reduce to $d'$ for equal variance/covariance.

==== Bayes discriminability index ====
This is the maximum (Bayes-optimal) discriminability index for two distributions, based on the amount of their overlap, i.e. the optimal (Bayes) error of classification $e_b$ by an ideal observer, or its complement, the optimal accuracy $a_b$:

$$d'_b=-2Z\left(\text{Bayes error rate } e_b\right)=2Z\left(\text{best accuracy rate } a_b\right)$$,

where $Z$ is the inverse cumulative distribution function of the standard normal. The Bayes discriminability between univariate or multivariate normal distributions can be numerically computed (Matlab code), and may also be used as an approximation when the distributions are close to normal.

$d'_b$ is a positive-definite statistical distance measure that is free of assumptions about the distributions, like the Kullback–Leibler divergence $D_\text{KL}$. $D_\text{KL}(a,b)$ is asymmetric, whereas $d'_b(a,b)$ is symmetric for the two distributions. However, $d'_b$ does not satisfy the triangle inequality, so it is not a full metric.

In particular, for a yes/no task between two univariate normal distributions with means $\mu_a,\mu_b$ and variances $v_a>v_b$, the Bayes-optimal classification accuracies are:

$$p(A|a)=p({\chi'}^2_{1,v_a \lambda} > v_b c), \; \; p(B|b)=p({\chi'}^2_{1,v_b \lambda} < v_a c)$$,

where $\chi'^2$ denotes the non-central chi-squared distribution, $\lambda=\left(\frac{\mu_a-\mu_b}{v_a-v_b}\right)^2$, and $c=\lambda+\frac{\ln v_a -\ln v_b}{v_a-v_b}$. The Bayes discriminability $d'_b=2Z\left(\frac{p\left(A|a\right)+p\left(B|b\right)}{2} \right).$

$d'_b$ can also be computed from the ROC curve of a yes/no task between two univariate normal distributions with a single shifting criterion. It can also be computed from the ROC curve of any two distributions (in any number of variables) with a shifting likelihood-ratio, by locating the point on the ROC curve that is furthest from the diagonal.

For a two-interval task between these distributions, the optimal accuracy is $a_b=p \left( \tilde{\chi}^2_{\boldsymbol{w}, \boldsymbol{k}, \boldsymbol{\lambda},0,0}>0 \right)$ ($\tilde{\chi}^2$ denotes the generalized chi-squared distribution), where
$$\boldsymbol{w}=\begin{bmatrix} \sigma_s^2 & -\sigma_n^2 \end{bmatrix}, \; \boldsymbol{k}=\begin{bmatrix} 1 & 1 \end{bmatrix}, \; \boldsymbol{\lambda}=\frac{\mu_s-\mu_n}{\sigma_s^2-\sigma_n^2} \begin{bmatrix} \sigma_s^2 & \sigma_n^2 \end{bmatrix}$$
. The Bayes discriminability $d'_b=2Z\left(a_b\right)$.

==== RMS sd discriminability index ====
A common approximate (i.e. sub-optimal) discriminability index that has a closed-form is to take the average of the variances, i.e. the rms of the two standard deviations: $d'_a=\left\vert \mu_a -\mu_b \right\vert/\sigma_\text{rms}$ (also denoted by $d_a$). It is $\sqrt{2}$ times the $z$-score of the area under the receiver operating characteristic curve (AUC) of a single-criterion observer. This index is extended to general dimensions as the Mahalanobis distance using the pooled covariance, i.e. with $\mathbf{S}_\text{rms}=\left[\left(\mathbf{\Sigma}_a+\mathbf{\Sigma}_b\right)/2 \right]^\frac{1}{2}$ as the common sd matrix.

==== Average sd discriminability index ====
Another index is $d'_e=\left\vert \mu_a -\mu_b \right\vert/\sigma_\text{avg}$, extended to general dimensions using $\mathbf{S}_\text{avg}=\left(\mathbf{S}_a+\mathbf{S}_b\right)/2$ as the common sd matrix.

== Contribution to discriminability by each dimension ==
In general, the contribution to the total discriminability by each dimension or feature may be measured using the amount by which the discriminability drops when that dimension is removed. If the total Bayes discriminability is $d'$ and the Bayes discriminability with dimension $i$ removed is $d'_{-i}$, we can define the contribution of dimension $i$ as $\sqrt{d'^2-{d'_{-i}}^2}$. This is the same as the individual discriminability of dimension $i$ when the covariance matrices are equal and diagonal, but in the other cases, this measure more accurately reflects the contribution of a dimension than its individual discriminability.

== Scaling the discriminability of two distributions ==
Scaling the discriminability of two distributions, by linearly interpolating the mean vector and standard deviation matrix (square root of the covariance matrix) of one towards the other. Ellipses are the error ellipses of the two distributions. Black curve is a quadratic boundary that separates the two distributions.

We may sometimes want to scale the discriminability of two data distributions by moving them closer or further apart. One such case is when we are modeling a detection or classification task, and the model performance exceeds that of the subject or observed data. In that case, we can move the model variable distributions closer together to match the observed performance, while also predicting which specific data points should start overlapping and be misclassified.

There are several ways of doing this. One is to compute the mean vector and covariance matrix of the two distributions, then effect a linear transformation to interpolate the mean and standard deviation matrix (square root of the covariance matrix) of one of the distributions towards the other.

Another way that is by computing the decision variables of the data points (log likelihood ratio which a point belongs to one distribution vs another) under a multinormal model, then moving these decision variables closer together or further apart.

== See also ==
- Receiver operating characteristic (ROC)
- Summary statistics
- Effect size
