= Stanislav Petrov =

Soviet Air Defence Forces officer (1939–2017)

- Станислав Петров
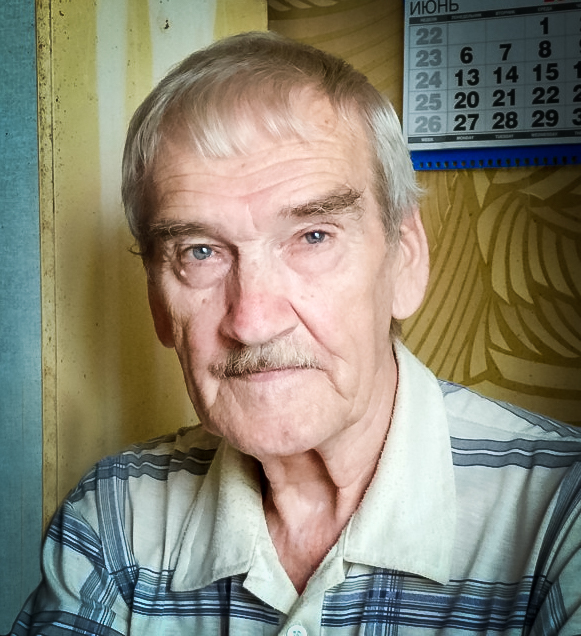
- Petrov in 2016
- Born: 7 September 1939; Vladivostok, Russian SFSR, Soviet Union
- Died: 19 May 2017 (aged 77); Fryazino, Russia
- Known for: 1983 Soviet nuclear false alarm incident
- Spouse: Raisa Petrova (m. 1973)
- Children: 2
- Military career
- Allegiance: Soviet Union
- Branch: Soviet Air Defence Forces
- Service years: 1972–1984
- Rank: Lieutenant colonel

Stanislav Yevgrafovich Petrov (Russian: Станислав Евграфович Петров; 7 September 1939 – 19 May 2017) was a Russian lieutenant colonel of the Soviet Air Defence Forces who played a key role in the 1983 Soviet nuclear false alarm incident. On 26 September 1983, Petrov was the duty officer at the command center for the Oko nuclear early-warning system when the system reported that a missile had been launched from the United States, followed by up to four more. Petrov correctly judged the reports to be a false alarm.

His subsequent decision to disobey orders, against Soviet military protocol, is credited with having prevented an erroneous retaliatory nuclear attack on the United States and its NATO allies that would have likely resulted in a large-scale nuclear war. An investigation later confirmed that the Soviet satellite warning system had indeed malfunctioned. Because his decision may have averted a retaliatory nuclear strike, Petrov is often credited as having "saved the world".

== Early life and military career ==
Petrov was born on 7 September 1939 to a Russian family near Vladivostok. His father, Yevgraf, flew fighter aircraft during World War II. His mother was a nurse.

Petrov enrolled at the Kiev Military Aviation Engineering Academy of the Soviet Air Forces, and after graduating in 1972 he joined the Soviet Air Defence Forces. In the early 1970s, he was assigned to the organization that oversaw the new early warning system intended to detect ballistic missile attacks from NATO countries.

Petrov was married to Raisa, and had a son, Dmitri, and a daughter, Yelena. His wife died of cancer in 1997.

== 1983 Soviet nuclear false alarm incident ==
On 26 September 1983, during the Cold War, the Soviet nuclear early warning system Oko reported the launch of one intercontinental ballistic missile with four more missiles behind it from the United States. Petrov, suspecting a false alarm, decided to wait for a confirmation that never came. According to the Permanent Mission of the Russian Federation to the UN, nuclear retaliation requires that multiple sources confirm an attack. In any case, the incident exposed a serious flaw in the Soviet early warning system.

Had Petrov reported incoming American missiles, his superiors might have launched an assault against the United States, precipitating a corresponding nuclear response from the United States. Petrov declared the system's indication a false alarm. Later, it was apparent that he was right: no missiles were approaching and the computer detection system was malfunctioning. It was subsequently determined that the false alarm had been created by a rare alignment of sunlight on high-altitude clouds above North Dakota and the Molniya orbits of the satellites, an error later corrected by cross-referencing a geostationary satellite.

Petrov later indicated multiple influences for his judgment: That he had been told a U.S. strike would be all-out, so a mere five missiles seemed an illogical start; that the launch detection system was new and, in his view, not yet wholly trustworthy; that the message passed through 30 layers of verification too quickly; and that ground radar failed to pick up corroborating evidence, even after minutes of delay. However, in a 2013 interview, Petrov said at the time he was never sure that the alarm was erroneous. He felt that his civilian training helped him make the right decision. He said that his colleagues were all professional soldiers with purely military training and, following instructions, would have reported a missile launch if they had been on his shift.

Petrov later said "I had obviously never imagined that I would ever face that situation. It was the first and, as far as I know, also the last time that such a thing had happened, except for simulated practice scenarios."

=== Significance ===
In a later interview, Petrov stated that the famous red button was never made operational, as military psychologists did not want to put the decision of initiating a nuclear war into the hands of one single person.

There is some confusion as to precisely what Petrov's military role was in this incident. Petrov, as an individual, was not in a position where he could have single-handedly launched any of the Soviet missile arsenal. His sole duty was to monitor satellite surveillance equipment and report missile attack warnings up the chain of command; top Soviet leadership would have decided whether to launch a retaliatory attack against the West. But Petrov's role was crucial in providing information to make that decision. According to Bruce G. Blair, a Cold War nuclear strategies expert and nuclear disarmament advocate, formerly with the Center for Defense Information, "The top leadership, given only a couple of minutes to decide, told that an attack had been launched, would make a decision to retaliate." In contrast, nuclear security scholar Pavel Podvig argues that, while Petrov did the right thing, "there were at least three assessment and decision-making layers above the command center of the army that operated the satellites", so that Petrov's report would not have directly led to a nuclear launch. In addition, he states that, even if the US strike was deemed to be real, the USSR would only have commenced its own strike after actual nuclear explosions on its territory.

In 2006, when Petrov was first honored for his actions at the United Nations, the Permanent Mission of the Russian Federation to the United Nations issued a press release contending that a single person could have neither started nor prevented a nuclear war, stating in part, "Under no circumstances a decision to use nuclear weapons could be made or even considered in the Soviet Union or in the United States on the basis of data from a single source or a system. For this to happen, a confirmation is necessary from several systems: ground-based radars, early warning satellites, intelligence reports, etc."

But Blair has said that at that time, the U.S.–Soviet relationship had deteriorated to the point where "the Soviet Union as a system—not just the Kremlin, not just Andropov, not just the KGB—but as a system, was geared to expect an attack and to retaliate very quickly to it. It was on hair-trigger alert. It was very nervous and prone to mistakes and accidents. The false alarm that happened on Petrov's watch could not have come at a more dangerous, intense phase in US–Soviet relations." At that time, according to Oleg Kalugin, a former KGB chief of foreign counterintelligence, "The danger was in the Soviet leadership thinking, 'The Americans may attack, so we better attack first.'"

=== Aftermath ===
Petrov underwent intense questioning by his superiors about his judgment. Initially, he was praised for his decision. Colonel-general Yuri Votintsev, the then-commander of the Soviet Air Defense's Missile Defense Units, who was the first to hear Petrov's report of the incident (and the first to reveal it to the public in the 1990s), states that Petrov's "correct actions" were "duly noted". Petrov himself states he was initially praised by Votintsev and promised a reward, but recalls that he was also reprimanded for improper filing of paperwork because he had not described the incident in the war diary.

Petrov has said that he was neither rewarded nor punished for his actions. According to Petrov, he received no reward because the incident and other bugs found in the missile detection system embarrassed his superiors and the scientists who were responsible for it, so that if he had been officially rewarded, they would have had to be punished. He was reassigned to a less sensitive post, took early retirement (although he emphasized that he was not "forced out" of the army), and suffered a nervous breakdown.

The incident became known publicly in 1998 upon the publication of Votintsev's memoirs. Widespread media reports since then have increased public awareness of Petrov's actions.

== Later life and death ==
After leaving the military in 1984, Petrov was hired at the same research institute that had developed the Soviet Union's early warning system. He later retired so he could care for his wife after she was diagnosed with cancer.

During a visit to the United States for the filming of the documentary The Man Who Saved the World, Petrov toured the Minuteman Missile National Historic Site in May 2007 and commented, "I would never have imagined being able to visit one of the enemy's securest sites."

Petrov died on 19 May 2017 from pneumonia, though it was not widely reported until September. He was 77.

Encyclopedia Britannica noted his death with the words "He is survived by his two children, two grandchildren, and the entire human race."

== Awards and commendations ==
On 21 May 2004, the San Francisco-based Association of World Citizens gave Petrov its World Citizen Award along with a trophy and $1,000 "in recognition of the part he played in averting a catastrophe." In January 2006, Petrov travelled to the United States where he was honored in a meeting at the United Nations in New York City. There, the Association of World Citizens presented him with a second special World Citizen Award. The next day, he met American journalist Walter Cronkite at his CBS office in New York City.

That interview, in addition to other highlights of Petrov's trip to the United States, was filmed for The Man Who Saved the World, a narrative feature and documentary film, directed by Peter Anthony. It premiered in October 2014 at the Woodstock Film Festival in Woodstock, New York, winning "Honorable Mention: Audience Award Winner for Best Narrative Feature" and "Honorable Mention: James Lyons Award for Best Editing of a Narrative Feature."

Various internet communities commemorate 26 September as Stanislav Petrov day, following Eliezer Yudkowsky's blog post highlighting the story: "Wherever you are, whatever you're doing, take a minute to not destroy the world.".

For his actions in averting a potential nuclear war in 1983, Petrov received the Dresden Peace Prize in Dresden, Germany, on 17 February 2013. The award included €25,000. On 24 February 2012, he was given the 2011 German Media Award, presented to him at a ceremony in Baden-Baden, Germany.

On 26 September 2018, he was posthumously honored in New York with the $50,000 Future of Life Award. At a ceremony at the National Museum of Mathematics in New York, former United Nations Secretary General Ban Ki-Moon said: "It is hard to imagine anything more devastating for humanity than all-out nuclear war between Russia [sic] and the United States. Yet this might have occurred by accident on September 26, 1983, were it not for the wise decisions of Stanislav Yevgrafovich Petrov. For this, he deserves humanity's profound gratitude. Let us resolve to work together to realize a world free from fear of nuclear weapons, remembering the courageous judgement of Stanislav Petrov." As Petrov had died, the award was collected by his daughter, Elena. Petrov's son Dmitri missed his flight to New York because the US embassy delayed his visa.

Petrov said he did not know whether he should have regarded himself as a hero for what he did that day. In an interview for the film The Man Who Saved the World, Petrov says, "All that happened didn't matter to me—it was my job. I was simply doing my job, and I was the right person at the right time, that's all. My late wife for 10 years knew nothing about it. 'So what did you do?' she asked me. 'Nothing. I did nothing.'"

The story of the nuclear incident is portrayed in the novel La redención del camarada Petrov (The Redemption of Comrade Petrov) by Argentinian writer Eduardo Sguiglia (Edhasa, 2023).

== See also ==
- Vasily Arkhipov – a Soviet naval officer who refused to launch a nuclear torpedo during the 1962 Cuban Missile Crisis
- List of nuclear close calls
