= Detection theory =

Means to measure signal processing ability

Detection theory or signal detection theory is a means to measure the ability to differentiate between information-bearing patterns (called stimulus in living organisms, signal in machines) and random patterns that distract from the information (called noise, consisting of background stimuli and random activity of the detection machine and of the nervous system of the operator).

In the field of electronics, signal recovery is the separation of such patterns from a disguising background.

According to the theory, there are a number of determiners of how a detecting system will detect a signal, and where its threshold levels will be. The theory can explain how changing the threshold will affect the ability to discern, often exposing how adapted the system is to the task, purpose or goal at which it is aimed. When the detecting system is a human being, characteristics such as experience, expectations, physiological state (e.g. fatigue) and other factors can affect the threshold applied. For instance, a sentry in wartime might be likely to detect fainter stimuli than the same sentry in peacetime due to a lower criterion, however they might also be more likely to treat innocuous stimuli as a threat.

Much of the early work in detection theory was done by radar researchers. By 1954, the theory was fully developed on the theoretical side as described by Peterson, Birdsall and Fox and the foundation for the psychological theory was made by Wilson P. Tanner, David M. Green, and John A. Swets, also in 1954. Detection theory was used in 1966 by John A. Swets and David M. Green for psychophysics. Green and Swets criticized the traditional methods of psychophysics for their inability to discriminate between the real sensitivity of subjects and their (potential) response biases.

Detection theory has applications in many fields such as diagnostics of any kind, quality control, telecommunications, and psychology. The concept is similar to the signal-to-noise ratio used in the sciences and confusion matrices used in artificial intelligence. It is also usable in alarm management, where it is important to separate important events from background noise.

== Psychology ==
Signal detection theory (SDT) is used when psychologists want to measure the way we make decisions under conditions of uncertainty, such as how we would perceive distances in foggy conditions or during eyewitness identification. SDT assumes that the decision maker is not a passive receiver of information, but an active decision-maker who makes difficult perceptual judgments under conditions of uncertainty. In foggy circumstances, we are forced to decide how far away from us an object is, based solely upon visual stimulus which is impaired by the fog. Since the brightness of the object, such as a traffic light, is used by the brain to discriminate the distance of an object, and the fog reduces the brightness of objects, we perceive the object to be much farther away than it actually is (see also decision theory). According to SDT, during eyewitness identifications, witnesses base their decision as to whether a suspect is the culprit or not based on their perceived level of familiarity with the suspect.

To apply signal detection theory to a data set where stimuli were either present or absent, and the observer categorized each trial as having the stimulus present or absent, the trials are sorted into one of four categories:

	Respond "Absent"	Respond "Present"
Stimulus Present	Miss	Hit
Stimulus Absent	Correct Rejection	False Alarm

Based on the proportions of these types of trials, numerical estimates of sensitivity can be obtained with statistics like the sensitivity index d' and A', and response bias can be estimated with statistics like c and β. β is the measure of response bias.

Signal detection theory can also be applied to memory experiments, where items are presented on a study list for later testing. A test list is created by combining these 'old' items with novel, 'new' items that did not appear on the study list. On each test trial the subject will respond 'yes, this was on the study list' or 'no, this was not on the study list'. Items presented on the study list are called Targets, and new items are called Distractors. Saying 'Yes' to a target constitutes a Hit, while saying 'Yes' to a distractor constitutes a False Alarm.

	Respond "No"	Respond "Yes"
Target	Miss	Hit
Distractor	Correct Rejection	False Alarm

== Applications ==
Signal Detection Theory has wide application, both in humans and animals. Topics include memory, stimulus characteristics of schedules of reinforcement, etc.

=== Sensitivity or discriminability ===
Conceptually, sensitivity refers to how hard or easy it is to detect that a target stimulus is present from background events. For example, in a recognition memory paradigm, having longer to study to-be-remembered words makes it easier to recognize previously seen or heard words. In contrast, having to remember 30 words rather than 5 makes the discrimination harder. One of the most commonly used statistics for computing sensitivity is the so-called sensitivity index or d'. There are also non-parametric measures, such as the area under the ROC-curve.

=== Bias ===
Bias is the extent to which one response is more probable than another, averaging across stimulus-present and stimulus-absent cases. That is, a receiver may be more likely overall to respond that a stimulus is present or more likely overall to respond that a stimulus is not present. Bias is independent of sensitivity. Bias can be desirable if false alarms and misses lead to different costs. For example, if the stimulus is a bomber, then a miss (failing to detect the bomber) may be more costly than a false alarm (reporting a bomber when there is not one), making a liberal response bias desirable. In contrast, giving false alarms too often (crying wolf) may make people less likely to respond, a problem that can be reduced by a conservative response bias.

=== Compressed sensing ===
Another field which is closely related to signal detection theory is called compressed sensing (or compressive sensing). The objective of compressed sensing is to recover high dimensional but with low complexity entities from only a few measurements. Thus, one of the most important applications of compressed sensing is in the recovery of high dimensional signals which are known to be sparse (or nearly sparse) with only a few linear measurements. The number of measurements needed in the recovery of signals is by far smaller than what Nyquist sampling theorem requires provided that the signal is sparse, meaning that it only contains a few non-zero elements. There are different methods of signal recovery in compressed sensing including basis pursuit, expander recovery algorithm, CoSaMP and also fast non-iterative algorithm. In all of the recovery methods mentioned above, choosing an appropriate measurement matrix using probabilistic constructions or deterministic constructions, is of great importance. In other words, measurement matrices must satisfy certain specific conditions such as RIP (Restricted Isometry Property) or Null-Space property in order to achieve robust sparse recovery.

== Mathematics ==
=== P(H1|y) > P(H2|y) / MAP testing ===
In the case of making a decision between two hypotheses, H1, absent, and H2, present, in the event of a particular observation, y, a classical approach is to choose H1 when p(H1|y) > p(H2|y) and H2 in the reverse case. In the event that the two a posteriori probabilities are equal, one might choose to default to a single choice (either always choose H1 or always choose H2), or might randomly select either H1 or H2. The a priori probabilities of H1 and H2 can guide this choice, e.g. by always choosing the hypothesis with the higher a priori probability.

When taking this approach, usually what one knows are the conditional probabilities, p(y|H1) and p(y|H2), and the a priori probabilities $p(H1) = \pi_1$ and $p(H2) = \pi_2$. In this case,

$p(H1|y) = \frac{p(y|H1) \cdot \pi_1}{p(y)}$,

$p(H2|y) = \frac{p(y|H2) \cdot \pi_2}{p(y)}$

where p(y) is the total probability of event y,

$p(y|H1) \cdot \pi_1 + p(y|H2) \cdot \pi_2$.

H2 is chosen in case

$\frac{p(y|H2) \cdot \pi_2}{p(y|H1) \cdot \pi_1 + p(y|H2) \cdot \pi_2} \ge \frac{p(y|H1) \cdot \pi_1}{p(y|H1) \cdot \pi_1 + p(y|H2) \cdot \pi_2}$

$\Rightarrow \frac{p(y|H2)}{p(y|H1)} \ge \frac{\pi_1}{\pi_2}$

and H1 otherwise.

Often, the ratio $\frac{\pi_1}{\pi_2}$ is called $\tau_{MAP}$ and $\frac{p(y|H2)}{p(y|H1)}$ is called $L(y)$, the likelihood ratio.

Using this terminology, H2 is chosen in case $L(y) \ge \tau_{MAP}$. This is called MAP testing, where MAP stands for "maximum a posteriori").

Taking this approach minimizes the expected number of errors one will make.

=== Bayes criterion ===
In some cases, it is far more important to respond appropriately to H1 than it is to respond appropriately to H2. For example, if an alarm goes off, indicating H1 (an incoming bomber is carrying a nuclear weapon), it is much more important to shoot down the bomber if H1 = TRUE, than it is to avoid sending a fighter squadron to inspect a false alarm (i.e., H1 = FALSE, H2 = TRUE) (assuming a large supply of fighter squadrons). The Bayes criterion is an approach suitable for such cases.

Here a utility is associated with each of four situations:

- $U_{11}$: One responds with behavior appropriate to H1 and H1 is true: fighters destroy bomber, incurring fuel, maintenance, and weapons costs, take risk of some being shot down;
- $U_{12}$: One responds with behavior appropriate to H1 and H2 is true: fighters sent out, incurring fuel and maintenance costs, bomber location remains unknown;
- $U_{21}$: One responds with behavior appropriate to H2 and H1 is true: city destroyed;
- $U_{22}$: One responds with behavior appropriate to H2 and H2 is true: fighters stay home, bomber location remains unknown;

As is shown below, what is important are the differences, $U_{11} - U_{21}$ and $U_{22} - U_{12}$.

Similarly, there are four probabilities, $P_{11}$, $P_{12}$, etc., for each of the cases (which are dependent on one's decision strategy).

The Bayes criterion approach is to maximize the expected utility:

$E\{U\} = P_{11} \cdot U_{11} + P_{21} \cdot U_{21} + P_{12} \cdot U_{12} + P_{22} \cdot U_{22}$

$E\{U\} = P_{11} \cdot U_{11} + (1-P_{11}) \cdot U_{21} + P_{12} \cdot U_{12} + (1-P_{12}) \cdot U_{22}$

$E\{U\} = U_{21} + U_{22} + P_{11} \cdot (U_{11} - U_{21}) - P_{12} \cdot (U_{22} - U_{12})$

Effectively, one may maximize the sum,

$U' = P_{11} \cdot (U_{11} - U_{21}) - P_{12} \cdot (U_{22} - U_{12})$,

and make the following substitutions:

$P_{11} = \pi_1 \cdot \int_{R_1}p(y|H1)\, dy$

$P_{12} = \pi_2 \cdot \int_{R_1}p(y|H2)\, dy$

where $\pi_1$ and $\pi_2$ are the a priori probabilities, $P(H1)$ and $P(H2)$, and $R_1$ is the region of observation events, y, that are responded to as though H1 is true.

$\Rightarrow U' = \int_{R_1} \left \{ \pi_1 \cdot (U_{11} - U_{21}) \cdot p(y|H1) - \pi_2 \cdot (U_{22} - U_{12}) \cdot p(y|H2) \right \} \, dy$

$U'$ and thus $U$ are maximized by extending $R_1$ over the region where

$\pi_1 \cdot (U_{11} - U_{21}) \cdot p(y|H1) - \pi_2 \cdot (U_{22} - U_{12}) \cdot p(y|H2) > 0$

This is accomplished by deciding H2 in case

$\pi_2 \cdot (U_{22} - U_{12}) \cdot p(y|H2) \ge \pi_1 \cdot (U_{11} - U_{21}) \cdot p(y|H1)$

$\Rightarrow L(y) \equiv \frac{p(y|H2)}{p(y|H1)} \ge \frac{\pi_1 \cdot (U_{11} - U_{21})}{\pi_2 \cdot (U_{22} - U_{12})} \equiv \tau_B$

and H1 otherwise, where L(y) is the so-defined likelihood ratio.

== See also ==
- Binary classification
- Constant false alarm rate
- Decision theory
- Demodulation
- Detector (radio)
- Estimation theory
- Just-noticeable difference
- Likelihood-ratio test
- Modulation
- Neyman–Pearson lemma
- Psychometric function
- Receiver operating characteristic
- Statistical hypothesis testing
- Statistical signal processing
- Two-alternative forced choice
- Type I and type II errors
