= 1983 Soviet nuclear false alarm incident =

Incident which nearly precipitated nuclear warfare

- Part of the Cold War (1979–1985) and nuclear close calls
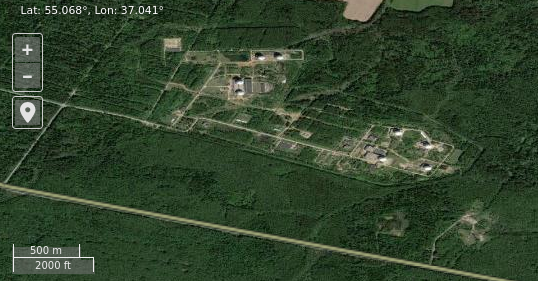
- Satellite imagery of Serpukhov-15 satellite ground station
- Date: 26 September 1983 (43 years ago)
- Location: Serpukhov-15, Soviet Union
- Cause: Erroneous interpretation by the Oko system of sunlight on high-altitude clouds and satellites' Molniya orbit as that of 5 U.S. intercontinental ballistic missiles
- Participants: Soviet Air Defence Forces; Stanislav Petrov
- Outcome: No nuclear launch; incident reported as false alarm

On 26 September 1983, during the Cold War, the Soviet nuclear early warning system Oko reported the launch of one intercontinental ballistic missile with four more missiles behind it, from the United States. These missile attack warnings were suspected to be false alarms by Stanislav Petrov (1939–2017), an engineer of the Soviet Air Defence Forces on duty at the command center of the early-warning system. He decided to wait for corroborating evidence—of which none arrived—rather than immediately relaying the warning up the chain of command. This decision is seen as having prevented a retaliatory nuclear strike against the United States and its NATO allies, which would likely have resulted in a full-scale nuclear war. Investigation of the satellite warning system later determined that the system had indeed malfunctioned.

== Background ==
The incident occurred at a time of severely strained relations between the United States and the Soviet Union. Responding to the Soviet Union's deployment of fourteen SS-20/RSD-10 theatre nuclear missiles, the NATO Double-Track Decision was taken in December 1979 by the military commander of NATO to deploy 108 Pershing II nuclear missiles in Western Europe with the ability to hit targets in eastern Ukraine, Belarus or Lithuania within 10 minutes and the longer range, but slower BGM-109G Ground Launched Cruise Missile (GLCM) to strike potential targets farther to the east. In mid-February 1981, and continuing until 1983, psychological operations by the United States began. These were designed to test Soviet radar vulnerability and to demonstrate US nuclear capabilities. They included clandestine naval operations in the Barents, Norwegian, Black and Baltic Sea and near the GIUK gap, as well as flights by American bombers, occasionally several times per week, directly toward Soviet airspace that turned away only at the last moment.

"It really got to them," recalls Dr. William Schneider Jr., [former] undersecretary of state for military assistance and technology, who saw classified "after-action reports" that indicated U.S. flight activity. "They didn't know what it all meant. A squadron would fly straight at Soviet airspace, and other radars would light up and units would go on alert. Then at the last minute the squadron would peel off and return home."

From the accounts of CIA and senior KGB officers, by May 1981, obsessed with historical parallels with the 1941 German invasion and Reaganite rhetoric, and with no defensive capability against the Pershing IIs, Soviet leaders believed the United States was preparing a secret nuclear attack on the USSR and initiated Operation RYaN. Under this, agents abroad monitored service and technical personnel who would implement a nuclear attack so as to be able either to preempt it or have mutually assured destruction.

On 1 September 1983, the Soviet military shot down a South Korean passenger jet, Korean Air Lines Flight 007, that had strayed into Soviet airspace. All 269 people aboard the aircraft were killed, including U.S. Representative Larry McDonald and many other Americans. The first Pershing II missiles were delivered to West Germany on 1 December 1983.

Bruce G. Blair, an expert on Cold War nuclear strategies and former president of the World Security Institute in Washington, D.C., says the American–Soviet relationship at that time:

... had deteriorated to the point where the Soviet Union as a system—not just the Kremlin, not just Soviet leader Yuri Andropov, not just the KGB, but as a system—was geared to expect an attack and to retaliate very quickly to it. It was on hair-trigger alert. It was very nervous and prone to mistakes and accidents. The false alarm that happened on Petrov's watch could not have come at a more dangerous, intense phase in U.S.–Soviet relations.

In an interview aired on American television, Blair said, "The Russians [Soviets] saw a U.S. government preparing for a first strike, headed by a President Ronald Reagan capable of ordering a first strike." Regarding the incident involving Petrov, he said, "I think that this is the closest our country has come to accidental nuclear war."

== Incident ==
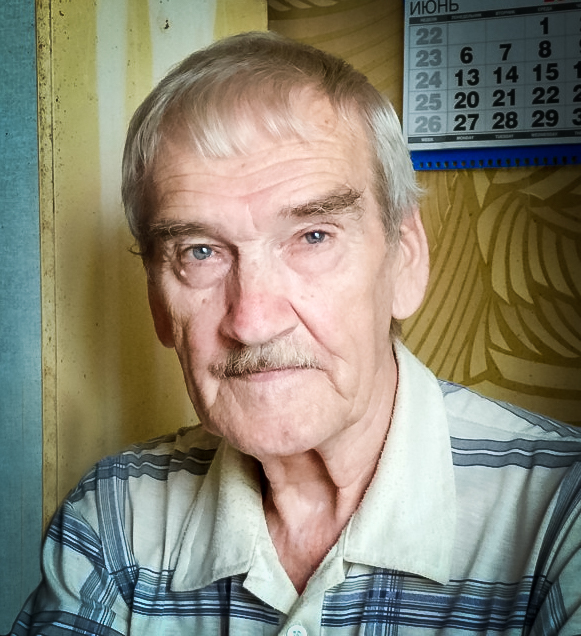
Petrov in 2016

On 26 September 1983, Stanislav Petrov, a lieutenant colonel in the Soviet Air Defense Forces, was the officer on duty at the Serpukhov-15 bunker near Moscow which housed the command center of the Soviet early warning satellites, code-named Oko. Petrov's responsibilities included observing the satellite early-warning network and notifying his superiors of any impending nuclear missile attack against the Soviet Union. If notification was received from the early-warning systems that inbound missiles had been detected, the Soviet Union's strategy was an immediate and compulsory nuclear counter-attack against the United States (launch on warning), specified in the doctrine of mutual assured destruction.

Shortly after midnight, the bunker's computers reported that one intercontinental ballistic missile was heading toward the Soviet Union from the United States. Petrov considered the detection a computer error, since a first-strike nuclear attack by the United States was likely to involve hundreds of simultaneous missile launches in order to disable any Soviet means of a counterattack. Furthermore, the satellite system's reliability had been questioned in the past. Petrov dismissed the warning as a false alarm, though accounts of the event differ as to whether he notified his superiors or not after he concluded that the computer detections were false and that no missile had been launched. Petrov's suspicion that the warning system was malfunctioning was confirmed when no missile arrived. Later, the computers identified four additional missiles in the air, all directed towards the Soviet Union. Petrov suspected that the computer system was malfunctioning again, despite having no direct means to confirm this. The Soviet Union's land radar was incapable of detecting missiles beyond the horizon.

It was subsequently determined that the false alarms were caused by a rare alignment of sunlight on high-altitude clouds and the satellites' Molniya orbits, an error later corrected by cross-referencing a centered geostationary satellite.

In explaining the factors leading to his decision, Petrov cited his belief and training that any U.S. first strike would be massive, so five missiles seemed an illogical start. In addition, the launch detection system was new and in his view not yet wholly trustworthy, while ground radar had failed to pick up corroborative evidence even after several minutes of the false alarm.

== Aftermath ==
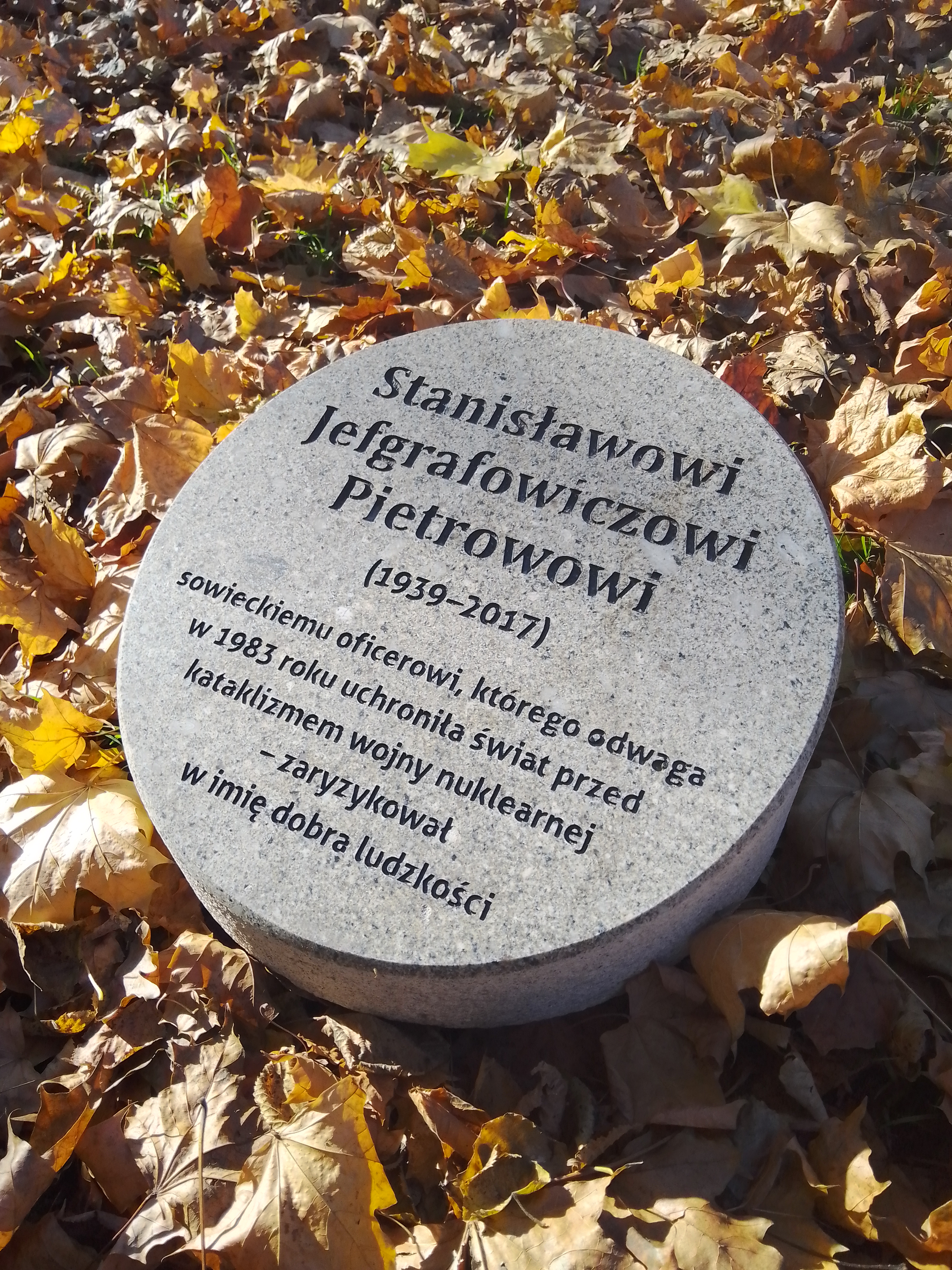
A memorial stone to Petrov in Warsaw, Poland, acknowledging his courage in the 1983 incident

Petrov underwent intense questioning by his superiors about his actions. Initially, he was praised for his decision. General Yuri Votintsev, then commander of the Soviet Air Defense's Missile Defense Units, who was the first to hear Petrov's report of the incident (and the first to reveal it to the public in 1998), stated that Petrov's "correct actions" were "duly noted". Petrov himself stated he was initially praised by Votintsev and was promised a reward, but recalled that he was also reprimanded for improper filing of paperwork with the pretext that he had not described the incident in the military diary.

He received no reward. According to Petrov, this was because the incident and other bugs found in the missile detection system embarrassed his superiors and the influential scientists who were responsible for it, so that if he had been officially rewarded, they would have had to be punished. He was reassigned to a less sensitive post, took early retirement (although he emphasized that he was not "forced out" of the army, as is sometimes claimed by Western sources), and suffered a nervous breakdown.

Oleg Kalugin, a former KGB chief of foreign counter-intelligence who knew Soviet leader Yuri Andropov well, said that Andropov's distrust of American leaders was profound. It was conceivable that if Petrov had declared the satellite warnings valid, such an erroneous report could have provoked the Soviet leadership into becoming bellicose. Kalugin said: "The danger was in the Soviet leadership thinking, 'The Americans may attack, so we better attack first.'"

== See also ==
- Able Archer 83 – NATO military exercise that happened over a month after the Petrov incident
- Dead Hand – Soviet nuclear weapons-control system
- List of nuclear close calls
- Norwegian rocket incident – a rocket carrying scientific equipment to study the aurora borealis that resembled a submarine-launched Trident missile
- Vasily Arkhipov – the subject of another nuclear war-averting incident during the Cuban Missile Crisis
- World War III – situations resulting in close encounters of a third world war
