= False alarm =

Deceptive or erroneous report of an emergency

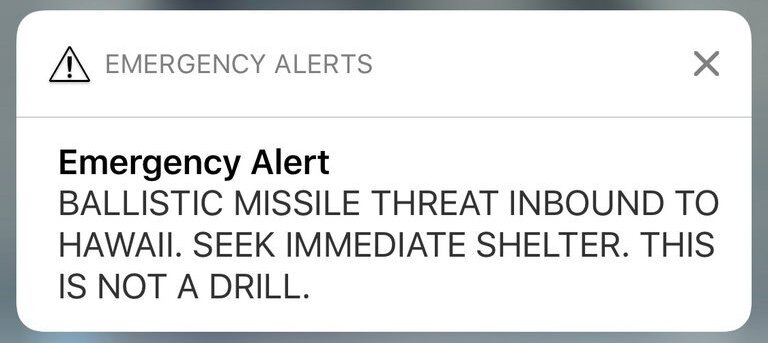
The 2018 Hawaii false missile alert accidentally caused panic over a nonexistent missile threat.

A false alarm, also called a nuisance alarm, is the deceptive or erroneous report of an emergency, causing unnecessary panic or bringing resources (such as emergency services) to a place where they are not needed. False alarms have the potential to divert emergency responders away from legitimate emergencies, which could ultimately lead to loss of life. In some cases, repeated false alarms in a certain area may cause occupants to develop alarm fatigue and to start ignoring most alarms, knowing that each time it will probably be false. Intentionally falsely activating alarms can lead to criminal penalties such as fines and jail time.

== Overview ==
Sociologist Robert Bartholomew explains that there are many negative effects of false alarms, such as "fear, havoc, disruptions to emergency services, and wasted resources." Health and safety can also be affected, as they can cause anxiety and encourage people to race toward an alarm or away from it, which can result in accidents in the panic. One more problem is the "Cry Wolf Effect", which can cause people to ignore legitimate alarms; "in the event of a real attack, subsequent warnings may be taken lightly or ignored altogether."

In the United States, between 94% and 98% of all burglar alarm activations are falsely triggered. Residential burglar alarms can be caused by improper arming and disarming of the system, power outages and weak batteries, wandering pets, and unsecured doors and windows. In the U.S. false alarms cost police agencies up 6.5 million personnel hours, according to the International Association of Chiefs of Police. A 2002 study by the U.S. Justice Department estimated the cost of false alarms to be as high as $1.5 billion. A home burglar alarm may accidentally activate due to power issues. These issues can be caused by weak batteries, an inconsistent power source (like voltage drops or current rises), or a power outage where a backup power method is either absent or weakened.

In industrial alarm management, a false alarm (nuisance alarm) could refer either to an alarm with little information content that can usually safely be eliminated, or one that could be valid but is triggered by a faulty instrument.

== Examples ==
- The 1983 Soviet nuclear false alarm incident was caused when the Soviet Air Defense Forces' early warning system erroneously detected inbound missiles from the United States, when in reality it was a misreading caused by a specific alignment of sunlight on high-altitude clouds. The lieutenant colonel, Stanislav Petrov, recognized the false alarm, which avoided a full-scale nuclear war between the two countries.
- Prior to the Boland Hall fire at Seton Hall University on January 19, 2000, many students ignored or got used to false fire alarms, which were a frequent occurrence. The fire and evacuation resulted in the deaths of 3 students and more than 50 injuries.
- On February 1, 2005, an alert sent to portions of Connecticut in error called for the evacuation of the entire state.
- The Hawaii missile alert on January 13, 2018, was triggered by an accidental emergency message being sent out to those in the state warning of an incoming ballistic missile.

Likewise, after too many audible car alarms are found false, most people no longer pay attention to see whether someone is stealing a vehicle, so even certain experienced thieves may confess that these alarms would not deter them from stealing vehicles.
