= Biomarker (disambiguation) =

Biomarker broadly refers to a measurable indicator of some biological state or condition.

Biomarker or biomarkers may refer more specifically to:

- Biomarker (aging), molecular indicator of biological age
- Biomarker (medicine), a measurable indicator of the severity or presence of some disease state
  - Biomarker (Alzheimer's), indicator of Alzheimer's disease
  - Biomarker (cancer), indicator of cancer
    - Tumor biomarker, a molecule secreted by a tumor
  - Biomarker (diabetes), indicator of diabetes mellitus
  - Imaging biomarker, an attribute in a medical image or scan indicative of a condition or disease
- Biomarker (toxicology), indicator of exposure to a chemical
- Biomarkers (journal), a peer-reviewed academic journal of biomarker research
- Biosignature, or biomarker, a fossil organic molecule that provides evidence of past or present life
