= N-terminal telopeptide =

Names
- Other names NTX; N-terminal crosslinked telopeptides of collagen 1; Collagen alpha-1(IX) chain

Identifiers
CAS Number	146644-81-7
3D model (JSmol)	Interactive image
- InChI: InChI=1S/C35H53N9O16/c1-17(46)29(35(60)39-14-25(48)38-15-28(53)54)44-34(59)24(16-45)43-31(56)21(4-2-3-11-36)40-32(57)22(9-10-26(49)50)41-33(58)23(13-27(51)52)42-30(55)20(37)12-18-5-7-19(47)8-6-18/h5-8,17,20-24,29,45-47H,2-4,9-16,36-37H2,1H3,(H,38,48)(H,39,60)(H,40,57)(H,41,58)(H,42,55)(H,43,56)(H,44,59)(H,49,50)(H,51,52)(H,53,54)/t17-,20+,21+,22+,23+,24+,29+/m1/s1 Key: NDMSLYATKUJCPL-DMTHXQJOSA-N
- SMILES: [C@@H](NC([C@@H](NC([C@@H](NC([C@H](CC1=CC=C(O)C=C1)N)=O)CC(O)=O)=O)CCC(O)=O)=O)(C(N[C@H](C(N[C@H](C(NCC(NCC(O)=O)=O)=O)[C@@H](C)O)=O)CO)=O)CCCCN

Properties
Chemical formula	C_{35}H_{53}N_{9}O_{16}
Molar mass	855.856 g·mol^{−1}
- Except where otherwise noted, data are given for materials in their standard state (at 25 °C [77 °F], 100 kPa). Infobox references

The N-terminal telopeptide (NTX), also known as amino-terminal collagen crosslinks, is the N-terminal telopeptide of fibrillar collagens such as collagen type I and type II. It is used as a biomarker to measure the rate of bone turnover. NTX can be measured in the urine (uNTX) or serum (serum NTX). The peptide consists of eight amino acids with the sequence YDEKSTGG.

== Usefulness of NTX as a biomarker ==
Evaluating an individual's rate of bone turnover, termed bone remodeling, directly may be important in assessing his or her potential nonsurgical treatment response as well as evaluating his or her risk of developing complications during healing following surgical intervention. To determine an individual's rate of bone turnover, numerous biomarkers are available in the body fluids that can be correlated to this rate, and one such biomarker is NTX.

However, while NTX does fluctuate in a very sensitive manner in line with bone resorption patterns, they are not very specific, in that they may vary spontaneously without physiologic intervention. For example, NTX levels may drop by 50% from day to day with no treatment, thus, making NTX levels unconvincing evidence of treatment effect.

Conversely, the serum CTX biomarker, described in 2000 by Rosen, appears to be a much more effective and valuable indicator of bone resorption rate.

== See also ==
- C-terminal telopeptide
