= Critical Path Institute =

Non-profit organization

- Founded: 2005
- Legal status: 501(c)(3) nonprofit organization
- Services: Improvement of the drug development process.
- CEO: Klaus Romero
- Website: c-path.org

Critical Path Institute (C-Path) is a nonprofit organization created to improve the drug development process; its consortia include more than 1,600 scientists from government regulatory and research agencies, academia, patient organizations, and bio-pharmaceutical companies.

== Background ==
The U.S. Food and Drug Administration (FDA) launched the Critical Path Initiative in 2004 to transform the way FDA-regulated medical products are developed, evaluated, and manufactured. C-Path was created as an independent organization to respond to the needs outlined in the FDA's initiative and with support and funding from the FDA, Science Foundation Arizona, and the Tucson, Arizona community. It operates as a neutral third party to enable scientists from the regulated industry and international regulatory agencies to work together with scientists from academia and patient groups to improve the drug development process.

== Approach ==
In the interest of national and global public health, C-Path develops large databases of aggregated clinical trial data that can be used to study disease progression. These data are also used to develop and qualify biomarkers and clinical outcome assessment instruments that are shared with the greater community for use in drug development. C-Path also develops quantitative models to facilitate the design of efficient clinical trials.

=== Regulatory science milestones ===
- EMA Qualification Opinion for low hippocampal volume by MRI as an enrichment tool in predementia Alzheimer’s disease trials (2011).
- FDA Letters of Support to C-Path’s CAMD for MRI hippocampal volume (2015) and CSF Aβ42, total tau, and phospho-tau (2015) as exploratory enrichment biomarkers in AD trials.

== Global Impact Conference (CGIC) ==
In 2024, C-Path launched the Global Impact Conference in Washington, D.C., convening regulators, industry, academics, and patient groups to share cross-therapeutic advances in regulatory science. The second CGIC took place on September 9–11, 2025, in Washington, D.C.

== C-Path Programs ==
C-Path programs are focused on reducing the time, cost, and risk of drug development and regulatory review. Where appropriate, C-Path forms consortia to improve the drug development process.

- The Predictive Safety Testing Consortium (PSTC) works to find improved safety biomarkers to detect drug induced toxicity. In 2018, the FDA issued its first ever qualification of a clinical safety biomarker panel for drug-induced kidney injury in Phase 1 trials, based on a composite of urinary markers developed through the FNIH Biomarkers Consortium and C-Path’s Predictive Safety Testing Consortium. In January 2025, FDA accepted a new Qualification Plan for an expanded urine biomarker panel intended to indicate early renal response to drug-induced injury during clinical trials.
- The Patient-Reported Outcome (PRO) Consortium develops, evaluates, and qualifies PRO instruments (e.g., questionnaires) for use in clinical trials designed to assess the safety and effectiveness of medical products.
- The Critical Path to TB Drug Regimens (CPTR) aims to accelerate the development of new, safe, and highly effective tuberculosis treatment regimens with shortened durations of therapy.
- The Polycystic Kidney Disease (PKD) Consortium evaluates the evidence supporting total kidney volume (TKV) as a biomarker for assessing the progression of autosomal dominant PKD.
- The Critical Path for Alzheimer's Disease (CPAD) aims to increase the efficiency of the development process of new treatments for Alzheimer disease (AD) and related neurodegenerative disorders with impaired cognition and function.
- The Critical Path for Parkinson's (CPP) works to improve the clinical trial process.
- The Data Collaboration Center (DCC) develops data solutions for scientific research.
- The Duchenne Regulatory Science Consortium (D-RSC) supports collaborative research through shared data access and drug development tools.
- The Electronic Patient-Reported Outcome Consortium (e-PRO) supports the collection of patient-focused outcomes data in clinical trials.
- The Huntington's Disease Regulatory Science Consortium (HD-RSC) aims to accelerate the regulatory approval of Huntington's disease therapies.
- The International Neonatal Consortium (INC) seeks to forge a predictable regulatory path for evaluating the safety and effectiveness of therapies for neonates.
- The Multiple Sclerosis Outcome Assessments Consortium (MSOAC) works to qualify a new measure of disability as a primary or secondary endpoint for future trials of MS therapies.
- The Type 1 Diabetes Consortium (T1D) works to qualify islet autoimmunity antibodies as prognostic biomarkers.
- The goal of the Transplant Therapeutics Consortium (TTC) is to accelerate the medical product development process for transplantation. In December 2022, the European Medicines Agency issued a Qualification Opinion for the iBox Scoring System as a secondary efficacy endpoint in kidney transplant trials. FDA later accepted the iBox Qualification Plan in November 2024 and issued a Notice of Review ability for the full qualification package in July 2025. If qualified, iBox would be used as a reasonably likely surrogate endpoint to support accelerated approval in kidney transplantation.
- The TB-Platform for Aggregation of Clinical TB Studies (TB-PACTS) curates and standardizes Phase III tuberculosis (TB) clinical trial data.
- The successfully completed Pediatric Trials Consortium worked toward the efficient evaluation of innovative drugs, biologics, and devices for children.
- Established in 2019 with FDA support and co-led with the National Organization for Rare Disorders (NORD), RDCA-DAP is a centralized, standardized repository and analytics hub for patient-level rare disease data used to develop drug-development tools and models across conditions.
- Relational Sequencing TB Data Platform. A curated global knowledge base linking Mycobacterium tuberculosis genomic variants with drug susceptibility and clinical data, used to support next-generation sequencing approaches in TB resistance surveillance and diagnostics.
- Launched in 2022 as the public-private partnership called for by the U.S. ACT for ALS law, the rare neurodegenerative disease consortiumRND is convened by C-Path with FDA and NIH to advance tools and standards that accelerate therapy development for ALS and related rare neurodegenerative diseases.

== Location ==
C-Path is headquartered in Tucson, Arizona. Raymond L. Woosley, M.D., Ph.D. founded C-Path in 2005 and is President Emeritus. Klaus Romero is currently CEO and Kristen Swingle is currently President and Chief Operating Officer. The Board of Directors includes Wainwright Fishburn, Timothy R. Franson, Bonnie Allin, Karen Bernstein, Louis Breton, Kay Holcombe, Jeffrey E. Jacob, Shaun A. Kirkpatrick, James W. Newman, former Pfizer CFO Alan Levin, Thomas Salmonson and biochemist Paula J. Olsiewski. C-Path operates a European nonprofit foundation headquartered in Amsterdam, established in March 2022 to expand collaboration with EU stakeholders. In July 2023, C-Path integrated its Dublin entity into the Amsterdam foundation to streamline European operations.
