= C-terminal telopeptide =

Names
- Other names H-Glu-Lys-Ala-His-Asp-Gly-Gly-Arg-OH

Identifiers
CAS Number	162929-64-8
3D model (JSmol)	Interactive image
ChemSpider	8481869
PubChem CID	10306403
- InChI: InChI=1S/C34H56N14O13/c1-17(44-31(58)20(5-2-3-9-35)46-29(56)19(36)7-8-26(51)52)28(55)47-22(11-18-13-39-16-43-18)32(59)48-23(12-27(53)54)30(57)42-14-24(49)41-15-25(50)45-21(33(60)61)6-4-10-40-34(37)38/h13,16-17,19-23H,2-12,14-15,35-36H2,1H3,(H,39,43)(H,41,49)(H,42,57)(H,44,58)(H,45,50)(H,46,56)(H,47,55)(H,48,59)(H,51,52)(H,53,54)(H,60,61)(H4,37,38,40)/t17-,19-,20-,21-,22-,23-/m0/s1 Key: LOJFGJZQOKTUBR-XAQOOIOESA-N
- SMILES: C[C@@H](C(=O)N[C@@H](CC1=CN=CN1)C(=O)N[C@@H](CC(=O)O)C(=O)NCC(=O)NCC(=O)N[C@@H](CCCN=C(N)N)C(=O)O)NC(=O)[C@H](CCCCN)NC(=O)[C@H](CCC(=O)O)N

Properties
Chemical formula	C_{34}H_{56}N_{14}O_{13}
Molar mass	868.907 g·mol^{−1}
- Except where otherwise noted, data are given for materials in their standard state (at 25 °C [77 °F], 100 kPa). Infobox references

The C-terminal telopeptide (CTX), also known as carboxy-terminal collagen crosslinks, is the C-terminal telopeptide of fibrillar collagens such as collagen type I and type II. It is used as a biomarker in the serum to measure the rate of bone turnover. It can be useful in assisting clinicians to determine a patient's nonsurgical treatment response as well as evaluate a patient's risk of developing complications during healing following surgical intervention. The test used to detect the CTX marker is called the Serum CrossLaps, and it is more specific to bone resorption than any other test currently available.

== Biomarker discovery ==
In the early 2000s, a link between bisphosphonate use and impaired bone physiology was noted. The strong inhibition of osteoclast function precipitated by bisphosphonate therapy can lead to inhibition of normal bone turnover, leading to impaired wound healing following trauma (such as dental surgery) or even spontaneous non-healing bone exposure. Because bisphosphonates are preferentially deposited in bone with high turnover rates, it is possible that the levels of bisphosphonate within the jaw bones are selectively elevated.

With the advent of implant dentistry, more dental patients are undergoing therapies in the oral cavity that involve bone healing, such as surgical implant placement and bone grafting procedures. In order to evaluate the risk of osteonecrosis for a patient taking bisphosphonates, use of the CTX biomarker was introduced in 2000 by Rosen.

== Use as a biomarker ==
Although a number of surrogate biomarkers exist for measuring the metabolic products of bone resorption, the serum CTX marker was chosen because it is both highly correlated to bone turnover rate and already available for detection in a laboratory test carried out by a major lab testing corporation.

The CTX test measures for the presence and concentration of a crosslink peptide sequence of type I collagen, found, among other tissues, in bone. This specific peptide sequence relates to bone turnover because it is the portion that is cleaved by osteoclasts during bone resorption, and its serum levels are therefore proportional to osteoclastic activity at the time the blood sample is drawn. Serum levels in healthy patients not taking bisphosphonates tends to hover above 300 pg/mL.

"Even though laboratory normal ranges are said to be between 50 pg/mL and 450 pg/mL, this normal range is not accurate related to the osteoporosis population. Actual normal values are usually well over 300 pg/mL and are most commonly 400 pg/mL to 550 pg/mL in patients not taking bisphosphonates. Lower values represent varying degrees of suppression of normal bone turnover, sometimes also called bone remodeling or bone renewal."

Patients who are placed on a 6-month drug holiday exhibit marked improvements in their serum CTX values; in one study, patients showed an improvement of 155.3 pg/mL over 6 months or a rate of 25.9 pg/mL each month.

Initially, urinary CTX levels were sought, but this proved to offer no greater value than urinary NTX values—both tests suffered from large spontaneous fluctuations unrelated to therapy or intervention, and were therefore largely unreliable. In contrast, the monoclonal antibody test for detecting serum CTX levels features minimal spontaneous disruption yet remarkable change to antiresorptive therapy, making the serum CTX assay both highly sensitive and specific.

== See also ==
- N-terminal telopeptide
