= Outcome measure =

Assessment of the effect of a medical treatment or procedure

An outcome measure, endpoint, effect measure or measure of effect is a measure within medical practice or research, (primarily clinical trials) which is used to assess the effect, both positive and negative, of an intervention or treatment. Measures can often be quantified using effect sizes. Outcomes measures can be patient-reported, or gathered through laboratory tests such as blood work, urine samples etc. or through medical examination. Outcomes measures should be relevant to the target of the intervention (be it a single person or a target population).

Depending on the design of a trial, outcome measures can be either primary outcomes, in which case the trial is designed around finding an adequate study size (through proper randomization and power calculation). Secondary or tertiary outcomes are outcome measures which are added after the design of the study is finalized, for example when data has already been collected. A study can have multiple primary outcome measures.

Outcome measures can be divided into clinical endpoints and surrogate endpoints where the former is directly related to what the goal of the intervention, and the latter are indirectly related.

== Relevance ==
Outcome measures used in trials should consider relevance to the target of the study. In clinical trials such measures of direct importance for an individual may be survival, quality of life, morbidity, suffering, functional impairment or changes in symptoms.

Outcome measures can be divided into clinical endpoints which are directly relevant to the target and surrogate endpoints (also called "proxy measures"), which are indirectly related. Death from cardiovascular disease is an example of a clinical endpoint, whereas measurements of blood pressure, which is not normally associated with any symptoms, is a surrogate endpoint. Other examples of surrogate endpoints are blood lipoproteins and bone density.

Composite measures or combined measures are common in clinical research. The rationale is that combining different outcome measures gives greater statistical power. For example, the composite measure "Killed or Seriously Injured" is often used in studies of road safety. While deaths are easier to count and are an outcome of undisputed importance, they are also much fewer than the number seriously injured; many of the "seriously injured" will not have experienced a major life event. However, composite measures should be used with care, particularly when surrogate endpoints are included. A statistically significant effect of a composite measure can often be explained solely by effects of a surrogate endpoint or a variable that is less relevant. It is also possible that composite measures may mask negative treatment effects of truly important outcomes, such as death or cardiovascular events.
