= Paula J. Olsiewski =

American biochemist

- Education: Yale College, Massachusetts Institute of Technology
- Spouse: John Healey
- Scientific career
- Fields: biochemist
- Workplaces: Alfred P. Sloan Foundation; Johns Hopkins Center for Health Security

Paula J. Olsiewski is an American biochemist who is a Contributing Scholar at the Johns Hopkins Center for Health Security. She was a Program Director at the Alfred P. Sloan Foundation, where she created and directed the Foundation's programs in the Microbiology of the Built Environment, the Chemistry of Indoor Environments and Civic Initiatives. She directed the Biosecurity program until its conclusion in 2011 and the Synthetic Biology program until its conclusion in 2014.

== Education ==
Olsiewski earned a bachelor's degree in chemistry, cum laude, from Yale College, and a Doctor of Philosophy in biological chemistry from the Massachusetts Institute of Technology (1979) with a thesis on D-amino acid dehydrogenase evolution, supervised by Christopher T. Walsh. From 1980 to 1982 she was a Postdoctoral Fellow in the lab of William H. Beers at New York University.

== Biotech and biomedical commercial development ==
Olsiewski directed commercial development for in vitro diagnostic products at Enzo Biochem, (NYSE:ENZ), a biotechnology company focused on the manipulation and modification of nucleic acids to produce therapeutic and diagnostic products. She directed the New York City Biotechnology Initiative, a state funded program to improve the region's ability to grow biotechnology companies by fostering relationships between industry and academia. She also established and directed the Technology Development Office at the Hospital for Special Surgery.

== Board and advisory committee roles ==
Olsiewski is chair of the Board of Scientific Counselors Homeland Security Research Subcommittee at the U.S. Environmental Protection Agency, and on the board of directors at the Critical Path Institute. In 2001 she served on the Board of Advisors for the WMD Center's Bio-Response Report Card. From 2003 to 2009 she was a member of the MIT Corporation. She was the first alumna to serve as President of the MIT Alumni Association (2003-2004), and served on the advisory board of the MIT Initiative on Faculty Race and Diversity (2008-2009). She was a member of the Committee on Advances in Technology and the Prevention of Their Application to Next Generation Biowarfare Threats, which produced the National Research Counsel Report “Globalization, Biosecurity, and the Future of Life Sciences” (2006). From 2005 to 2012 she served on the advisory board for the National Consortium for the Study of Terrorism and Responses to Terrorism (START).

== Selected writings & publications ==
- Haynie, Sharon L.; Hinkle, Amber S.; Jones, Nancy L.; Martin, Cheryl A.; Olsiewski, Paula J.; Roberts, Mary F. (2011). “Reflections on the Journey: Six Short Stories.” Chemistry Central Journal, 5 (69): 1–12. doi: 10.1186/1752-153X-5-69

Her most cited papers, according to Google Scholar:

- Olsiewski, Paula J.; Kaczorowski, Gregory J.; Walsh, Christopher; Kaback, H. Ronald (1981). "Reconstitution of Escherichia coli membrane vesicles with D-amino acid dehydrogenase". Biochemistry. 20 (21): 6272–6279. doi:10.1021/bi00524a056. PMID 6118175.
- Olsiewski, Paula J.; Kaczorowski, G. J.; Walsh, C. (1980). "Purification and properties of D-amino acid dehydrogenase, an inducible membrane-bound iron-sulfur flavoenzyme from Escherichia coli B." Journal of Biological Chemistry. 255 (10): 4487–4494. doi:10.1016/S0021-9258(19)85517-5. PMID 6102989.
- Olsiewski, Paula J.; Beers, William H. (1983). "cAMP synthesis in the rat oocyte". Developmental Biology. 100 (2): 287–293. doi:10.1016/0012-1606(83)90223-3. PMID 6317488.
- Morse, Stephen S.; Garwin, Richard L.; Olsiewski, Paula J. (2006). "Next flu pandemic: What to do until the vaccine arrives?". Science. 314 (5801): 929. doi:10.1126/science.1135823. PMID 17095681. S2CID 20519907.

== Awards and honors ==
In 1995, Olsiewski won the MIT Henry B. Kane '24 Award, which is given in recognition of exception service and accomplishments in the area of fundraising. In 2000, she received the MIT Bronze Beaver Alumni Award, which is given in recognition of distinguished service - it is the highest honor the Alumni Association bestows upon any of its members. Also in 2000, she received the Yale Class Distinguished Service Award, which is selected by the class leadership and bestowed to recognize and thank classmates who have dedicated time, energy and enthusiasm to the Class. In 2018, Olsiewski was elected as a AAAS Fellow in the Chemical Sciences division. In 2022, the International Society of Indoor Air Quality and Climate inducted Olsiewski as a new Academy Fellow and awarded her their Special Award ″in recognition of her advocacy and support of basic research for the microbiology and chemistry of the indoor environment.″
