= Clinical endpoint =

Outcome measures referring to occurrence of abnormalities in clinical research trials

Clinical endpoints or clinical outcomes are outcome measures referring to occurrence of disease, symptom, sign or laboratory abnormality constituting a target outcome in clinical research trials. The term may also refer to any disease or sign that strongly motivates withdrawal of an individual or entity from the trial, then often termed a humane (clinical) endpoint.

The primary endpoint of a clinical trial is the endpoint for which the trial is powered. Secondary endpoints are additional endpoints, preferably also pre-specified, for which the trial may not be powered.

Surrogate endpoints are trial endpoints that have outcomes that substitute for a clinical endpoint, often because studying the clinical endpoint is difficult, for example using an increase in blood pressure as a surrogate for death by cardiovascular disease, where strong evidence of a causal link exists.

== Scope ==
In a general sense, a clinical endpoint is included in the entities of interest in a trial. The results of a clinical trial generally indicate the number of people enrolled who reached the pre-determined clinical endpoint during the study interval compared with the overall number of people who were enrolled. Once a patient reaches the endpoint, he or she is generally excluded from further experimental intervention (the origin of the term endpoint).

For example, a clinical trial investigating the ability of a medication to prevent heart attack might use chest pain as a clinical endpoint. Any patient enrolled in the trial who develops chest pain over the course of the trial, then, would be counted as having reached that clinical endpoint. The results would ultimately reflect the fraction of patients who reached the endpoint of having developed chest pain, compared with the overall number of people enrolled.

When an experiment involves a control group, the proportion of individuals who reach the clinical endpoint after an intervention is compared with the proportion of individuals in the control group who reached the same clinical endpoint, reflecting the ability of the intervention to prevent the endpoint in question.

A clinical trial will usually define or specify a primary endpoint as a measure that will be considered success of the therapy being trialled (e.g. in justifying a marketing approval). The primary endpoint might be a statistically significant improvement in overall survival (OS). A trial might also define one or more secondary endpoints such as progression-free-survival (PFS) that will be measured and are expected to be met. A trial might also define exploratory endpoints that are less likely to be met.

== Examples ==
Clinical endpoints can be obtained from different modalities, such as behavioural or cognitive scores, or biomarkers from Electroencephalography (qEEG), MRI, PET, or biochemical biomarkers.

In clinical cancer research, common endpoints include discovery of local recurrence, discovery of regional metastasis, discovery of distant metastasis, onset of symptoms, hospitalization, increase or decrease in pain medication requirement, onset of toxicity, requirement of salvage chemotherapy, requirement of salvage surgery, requirement of salvage radiotherapy, death from any cause, or death from disease. A cancer study may be powered for overall survival, usually indicating time until death from any cause, or disease-specific survival, where the endpoint is death from disease or death from toxicity.

These are expressed as a period of time (survival duration) e.g., in months. Frequently the median is used so that the trial endpoint can be calculated once 50% of subjects have reached the endpoint, whereas calculation of an arithmetical mean can only be done after all subjects have reached the endpoint.

=== Disease free survival ===
The disease free survival is usually used to analyze the results of the treatment for the localized disease which renders the patient apparently disease free, such as surgery or surgery plus adjuvant therapy. In the disease-free survival, the event is relapse rather than death. The people who relapse are still surviving but they are no longer disease-free. Just as in the survival curves not all patients die, in "disease-free survival curves" not all patients relapse and the curve may have a final plateau representing the patients who did not relapse after the study's maximum follow-up. Because the patients survive for at least some time after the relapse, the curve for the actual survival would look better than disease free survival curve.

=== Progression free survival ===
The Progression Free Survival is usually used in analysing the results of the treatment for the advanced disease. The event for the progression free survival is that the disease gets worse or progresses, or the patient dies from any cause. Time to Progression is a similar endpoint that ignores patients who die before the disease progresses.

=== Response duration ===
The response duration is occasionally used to analyze the results of the treatment for the advanced disease. The event is progression of the disease (relapse). This endpoint involves selecting a subgroup of the patients. It measures the length of the response in those patients who responded. The patients who do not respond are not included.

=== Overall survival ===
Overall survival is based on death from any cause, not just the condition being treated, thus it picks up death from side effects of the treatment, and effects on survival after relapse.

=== Toxic Death Rate ===
Unlike overall survival, which is based on death from any cause or the condition being treated, the toxic death rate picks up just the deaths that are directly attributable to the treatment itself. These rates are generally low to zero as clinical trials are typically halted when toxic deaths occur. Even with chemotherapy the overall rate is typically under a percent. However, the lack of systematic autopsies limits our understanding of deaths due to treatments.

=== Percent serious adverse events ===
The percentage of treated patients experiencing one or more serious adverse events. Serious adverse events are defined by the US Food and Drug Administration as "Any AE occurring at any dose that results in any of the following outcomes:

- Death
- Life-threatening adverse drug experience
- Inpatient hospitalization or prolongation of existing hospitalization
- Persistent or significant incapacity or substantial disruption of the ability to conduct normal life functions
- Congenital anomaly/birth defect
- Important medical events (IME) that may not result in death, be life-threatening, or require hospitalization may be considered serious when, based upon appropriate medical judgment, they may jeopardize the patient or subject and may require medical or surgical intervention to prevent one of the outcomes listed in this definition."

== Humane endpoint ==
A humane endpoint can be defined as the point at which pain and/or distress is terminated, minimized or reduced for an entity in a trial (such as an experimental animal), by taking action such as killing the animal humanely, terminating a painful procedure, or giving treatment to relieve pain and/or distress. The occurrence of an individual in a trial having reached may necessitate withdrawal from the trial before the target outcome of interest has been fully reached.

== Surrogate endpoint ==
A surrogate endpoint (or marker) is a measure of effect of a specific treatment that may correlate with a real clinical endpoint but does not necessarily have a guaranteed relationship. The National Institutes of Health (USA) define surrogate endpoint as "a biomarker intended to substitute for a clinical endpoint".

== Combined endpoint ==
Some studies will examine the incidence of a combined endpoint, which can merge a variety of outcomes into one group. For example, the heart attack study above may report the incidence of the combined endpoint of chest pain, myocardial infarction, or death. An example of a cancer study powered for a combined endpoint is disease-free survival; trial participants experiencing either death or discovery of any recurrence would constitute the endpoint. Overall Treatment Utility is an example of a multidimensional composite endpoint in cancer clinical trials.

Regarding humane endpoints, a combined endpoint may constitute a threshold where there is enough cumulative degree of disease, symptoms, signs or laboratory abnormalities to motivate an intervention.

== Response rates ==
The response rate is the percentage of patients on whom a therapy has some defined effect; for example, the cancer shrinks or disappears after treatment.

When used as a clinical endpoint for trials of cancer treatments, this is often called the objective response rate (ORR). The FDA definition of ORR in this context is "the proportion of patients with tumor size reduction of a predefined amount and for a minimum time period." Another criterion is the clinical benefit rate (CBR), "the total number (or percentage) of patients who achieved a complete response, partial response, or had stable disease for 6 months or more".

Each trial, for whatever illness or condition, may define what is considered a complete response (CR) or partial response (PR) to the therapy or intervention. Hence the trials report the complete response rate and the overall response rate which includes CR and PR. (See e.g. Response evaluation criteria in solid tumors, and Small-cell carcinoma treatment, and for immunotherapies, Immune-related response criteria.)

== Consistency ==
Various studies on a particular topic often do not address the same outcomes, making it difficult to draw clinically useful conclusions when a group of studies is looked at as a whole. The Core Outcomes in Women's Health (CROWN) Initiative is one effort to standardize outcomes.

== See also ==
- Multiple comparisons problem
