= Biomarker Insights =

- Discipline: Biomarkers
- Language: English
- Edited by: Karen Pulford

Publication details
- History: 2006–present
- Publisher: SAGE Publications
- Open access: Yes

Standard abbreviations
- ISO 4: Biomark. Insights

Indexing
- CODEN: BIINHJ
- ISSN: 1177-2719
- OCLC no.: 71909732

Links
- Journal homepage; Online access

Biomarker Insights is a peer-reviewed open access academic journal focusing on biomarkers and their clinical applications. The journal aims to be a venue for rapid communications in the field. The journal was established in 2006 and was originally published by Libertas Academica. SAGE Publications became the publisher in September 2016. The editor in chief is Karen Pulford.

== Indexing ==
The journal is indexed in:

- Chemical Abstracts Service
- EBSCO Academic Research Complete
- Embase
- PubMed
- PubMed Central
- SCOPUS
