= PCA3 =

Non-coding RNA in the species Homo sapiens

Identifiers
- Aliases: PCA3, DD3, NCRNA00019, PCAT3, prostate cancer associated 3 (non-protein coding), prostate cancer associated 3, PRUNE2-AS1
- External IDs: OMIM: 604845; GeneCards: PCA3

Gene location (Human)
Chr.	Chromosome 9 (human)
Band	9q21.2	Start	76,691,980 bp
Band	9q21.2	End	76,863,307 bp
RNA expression pattern
Bgee	Human / Mouse (ortholog); Top expressed in: epithelium of colon; corpus callosum; sural nerve; Achilles tendon; testicle; popliteal artery; tibial arteries; gastric mucosa; thoracic aorta; ascending aorta / n/a; More reference expression data
BioGPS	n/a
Orthologs
Databases	NCBI: entry; OMA: entry
Species	Human	Mouse
Entrez	50652	n/a
Ensembl	ENSG00000225937	n/a
UniProt	n a	n/a
RefSeq (mRNA)	n/a	n/a
RefSeq (protein)	n/a	n/a
Location (UCSC)	Chr 9: 76.69 – 76.86 Mb	n/a
PubMed search		n/a
- Wikidata
View/Edit Human

Prostate cancer antigen 3 (PCA3, also referred to as DD3) is a gene that expresses a non-coding RNA. PCA3 is only expressed in human prostate tissue, and the gene is highly overexpressed in prostate cancer. Because of its restricted expression profile, the PCA3 RNA is useful as a tumor marker.

== Use as biomarker ==
The most frequently used biomarker for prostate cancer today is the serum level of prostate-specific antigen (PSA), or derived measurements. However, since PSA is prostate-specific but not cancer-specific, it is an imperfect biomarker. For example, PSA can increase in older men with benign prostatic hyperplasia. Several new biomarkers are being investigated to improve the diagnosis of prostate cancer. Some of these can be measured in urine samples, and it is possible that a combination of several urinary biomarkers will replace PSA in the future.

Compared to serum PSA, PCA3 has a lower sensitivity but a higher specificity and a better positive and negative predictive value. It is independent of prostate volume, whereas PSA is not. It should be measured in the first portion of urine after prostate massage with digital rectal examination.

PCA3 has been shown to be useful to predict the presence of malignancy in men undergoing repeat prostate biopsy. This means that it could be useful clinically for a patient for whom digital rectal examination and PSA suggest possible prostate cancer, but the first prostate biopsy returns a normal result. This occurs in approximately 60% of cases, and on repeat testing, 20-40% have an abnormal biopsy result.

Other uses that are being studied for PCA3 include its correlation with adverse tumor features such as tumor volume, grading (Gleason score) or extracapsular extension. These studies have so far produced conflicting results.

== Society and culture ==
A commercial kit called the Progensa PCA3 test is marketed by the Californian company Gen-Probe. Gen-Probe acquired rights to the PCA3 test from Diagnocure in 2003. In April 2012, Hologic bought Gen-Probe for $3.75 billion by cash.

== Discovery ==
PCA3 was discovered to be highly expressed by prostate cancer cells in 1999.
