= Raymond L. Woosley =

American pharmacologist

Raymond L. Woosley is an American pharmacologist who is the founding president and chairman of the board for AZCERT, a not-for-profit organization dedicated to improved outcomes from the use of medications. Prior to leading AZCERT, he was founder and President of Critical Path Institute (C-Path). C-Path is an independent, non-profit organization created by the U.S. Food and Drug Administration (FDA) and the University of Arizona to help launch the critical path initiative. Previously, he has served as Vice-President for Health Sciences and Dean of the College of Medicine at the University of Arizona. He is Professor of Medicine and Biomedical Informatics in the University of Arizona College of Medicine - Phoenix, Arizona.

== Background and training ==
Woosley, a native of Bowling Green, Kentucky, received his medical degree from the University of Miami School of Medicine in Miami, Florida, his doctorate in pharmacology from the University of Louisville, in Louisville, Kentucky, and his bachelor's degree from Western Kentucky University in Bowling Green, Kentucky.

He served his internship and residency in internal medicine and completed a fellowship in clinical pharmacology at Vanderbilt University. He is a Fellow of the American College of Physicians, the American College of Clinical Pharmacology, the American College of Cardiology, and the American Heart Association. He is married to Julianne Woosley and has three children.

== Professional experience ==
Woosley was the first scientist at Meyer Laboratories (now GlaxoSmithKline) from 1968 to 1971. He completed medical school, internal medicine, and clinical pharmacology training in 1976 and joined the Clinical Pharmacology faculty at Vanderbilt University Medical School, rising to the rank of professor of Medicine and Pharmacology. At Vanderbilt he served as the Associate Director of the NIH-funded General Clinical Research Center (GCRC) and was a founding member of the Vanderbilt Cardiac Arrhythmia Clinical Program.

In 1988, he was appointed Chairman of the Department of Pharmacology at Georgetown University Medical Center in Washington, D.C. During his tenure as Chairman, the Department of Pharmacology became one of the highest ranked pharmacology departments in research funding and received the largest endowment of any pharmacology department in the nation. At Georgetown, he founded the Division of Clinical Pharmacology, was Principal Investigator for the NIH-sponsored GCRC, and in 2000, Dr. Woosley was appointed Associate Dean for Clinical Research at Georgetown University.

In 2001, Woosley joined the faculty at The University of Arizona as Vice President of the Arizona Health Sciences Center and the Dean of the College of Medicine. He founded Critical Path Institute in 2004 and, in early 2012, he left to be founding President of AZCERT, a new not-for-profit organization dedicated to improved and safe use of medications.

== Medical research ==
Woosley's research has been continuously supported by competitively awarded federal grants since 1976; his research has been reported in over 300 peer-reviewed publications and in eleven patents. He has investigated the basic and clinical pharmacology of drugs, factors contributing to variable response to medicines, the medical management of arrhythmias, and the cardiac toxicity of drugs. While at Vanderbilt, Woosley was the co-director of the NIH-sponsored Cardiac Arrhythmia Suppression Trial (CAST) that found arrhythmia suppression by drugs to be an invalid biomarker for the prediction of drug therapy that prevents sudden death.

Woosley's research at Georgetown contributed substantially to the recognition that non-cardiovascular drugs, such as antihistamines (e.g., terfenadine (Seldane)), may have arrhythmogenic effects. Woosley's invention, fexofenadine (Allegra), resulted from this research and is today marketed as a safer non-sedating antihistamine replacing Seldane. His research on drug safety led Woosley to champion the development of the Centers for Education and Research on Therapeutics (CERTs), until 2016, a network of federally funded centers designed to improve outcomes in medical therapeutics.

In 2002, Woosley's research discovered the primary mechanism of methadone-induced sudden death. His subsequent research on methadone resulted in the addition of warnings to the official label. He is an authority on drugs, like methadone, that prolong the QT interval on the electrocardiogram and cause a particular potentially lethal cardiac arrhythmia, torsade de pointes. As President of AZCERT, he leads a team of scientists that maintains web-based lists of the drugs that have this potential toxicity; this website, with over 1,100 visits daily and over 66,000 registered users, is an internationally recognized resource cited in textbooks and used by researchers to evaluate the impact of drug safety programs.

== Leadership and service ==
Woosley was elected President of the American Society for Clinical Pharmacology and Therapeutics and the Association for Medical School Pharmacology Chairs. He has served on numerous advisory committees for the Food and Drug Administration, the National Institutes of Health, and the Department of Veterans Affairs. From 2009 to 2012 he was a member of the Drug Forum, a committee of the National Academy of Science's Institute of Medicine. He has served on the editorial boards for numerous cardiology and pharmacology journals. He has provided testimony on a wide range of healthcare and drug safety issues to Congressional Committees and hearings on 18 occasions.

== Honors and recognition ==
For his contributions to medicine, Woosley received the Rawls-Palmer Award and the William B. Abrams Award from the American Society of Clinical Pharmacology. He received the Harry Gold Award in Therapeutics from the American Society for Pharmacology and Experimental Therapeutics. He was the Sir Henry Hallet Dale Visiting Professorship in Clinical Pharmacology at the Johns Hopkins University School of Medicine. Dr. Woosley received the FDA Commissioner's Special Citation for his work on the toxicity of dietary supplements containing ephedra. In 2010 the PhRMA Foundation granted Woosley the Award in Excellence in Clinical Pharmacology. The University of Miami School of Medicine, the University of Louisville and Western Kentucky University have selected Woosley as a Distinguished Alumnus and the Significant Sig Award from the Sigma Chi Fraternity.
