= Molecular risk assessment =

- Purpose: estimate a person risk of getting cancer

Molecular risk assessment is a procedure in which biomarkers (for example, biological molecules or changes in tumor cell DNA) are used to estimate a person's risk for developing cancer. Specific biomarkers may be linked to particular types of cancer.
