= Biomarkers (journal) =

- Discipline: Biochemistry
- Language: English
- Edited by: Martin Möckel

Publication details
- History: 1996–present
- Publisher: Taylor & Francis
- Frequency: 8/year
- Impact factor: 2.016 (2015)

Standard abbreviations
- ISO 4: Biomarkers

Indexing
- CODEN: BIOMFA
- ISSN: 1354-750X (print); 1366-5804 (web)
- LCCN: 96641474
- OCLC no.: 34726943

Links
- Journal homepage; Online access; Online archive

Biomarkers is a peer-reviewed academic journal covering research on biomarkers. It is published by Taylor & Francis and the editor-in-chief is Martin Möckel (Charité). According to the Journal Citation Reports, the journal has a 2015 impact factor of 2.016.
