= Surrogate endpoint =

Biomarker proxy outcome measure

In clinical trials, a surrogate endpoint (also called a surrogate measure or surrogate marker) is a measure of effect of a specific treatment that may correlate with a real clinical endpoint but does not necessarily have a guaranteed relationship. The National Institutes of Health (USA) defines surrogate endpoint as "a biomarker intended to substitute for a clinical endpoint".

Surrogate markers are used when the primary endpoint is undesired (e.g., death), or when the number of events is very small, thus making it impractical to conduct a clinical trial to gather a statistically significant number of endpoints. The FDA and other regulatory agencies will often accept evidence from clinical trials that show a direct clinical benefit to surrogate markers.

Surrogate endpoints can be obtained from different modalities, such as, behavioural or cognitive scores, or biomarkers from Electroencephalography (qEEG), MRI, PET, or biochemical biomarkers.

A correlate does not make a surrogate. It is a common misconception that if an outcome is a correlate (that is, correlated with the true clinical outcome) it can be used as a valid surrogate endpoint (that is, a replacement for the true clinical outcome). However, proper justification for such replacement requires that the effect of the intervention on the surrogate endpoint predicts the effect on the clinical outcome: a much stronger condition than correlation. In this context, the term Prentice criteria is used.

The most commonly used approach to validate a surrogate endpoint is to conduct a meta-analysis of randomized clinical trials in which the surrogate and the true endpoints are measured.

A surrogate endpoint of a clinical trial is a laboratory measurement or a physical sign used as a substitute for a clinically meaningful endpoint that measures directly how a patient feels, functions or survives. Changes induced by a therapy on a surrogate endpoint are expected to reflect changes in a clinically meaningful endpoint.

== Examples ==
=== Cardiovascular disease ===
A commonly used example is cholesterol. While elevated cholesterol levels increase the likelihood for heart disease, the relationship is not linear - many people with normal cholesterol develop heart disease, and many with high cholesterol do not. "Death from heart disease" is the endpoint of interest, but "cholesterol" is the surrogate marker. A clinical trial may show that a particular drug (for example, simvastatin (Zocor)) is effective in reducing cholesterol, without showing directly that simvastatin prevents death. Proof of Zocor's efficacy in reducing cardiovascular disease was only presented five years after its original introduction, and then only for secondary prevention. In another case, AstraZeneca was accused of marketing rosuvastatin (Crestor) without providing hard endpoint data, relying instead on surrogate endpoints. The company countered that rosuvastatin had been tested on larger groups of patients than any other drug in the class, and that its effects should be comparable to the other statins.

=== Cancer ===
Progression Free Survival is a prominent example in Oncology contexts. There are examples of cancer drugs approved on the basis of progression-free survival failed to show subsequent improvements in overall survival in subsequent studies. In breast cancer, Bevacizumab (Avastin) initially gained approval from the Food and Drug Administration, but subsequently had its license revoked. More patient focused surrogate endpoints may offer a more meaningful alternative such as Overall Treatment Utility.

=== Infectious disease ===
In HIV/AIDS medicine, CD4 counts and viral loads are used as surrogate markers for drug approval for clinical trials.

In hepatitis C medicine, the surrogate endpoint "Sustained Virological Response" has been used for the approval of expensive drugs known as Direct Acting Antivirals. The validity of this surrogate endpoint for predicting clinical outcomes has been challenged.

For several vaccines (anthrax, hepatitis A, etc), the induction of detectable antibodies in blood is used as a surrogate marker for vaccine effectiveness, as exposure of individuals to an actual pathogen is considered unethical.

=== Alzheimer's disease ===
A recent study showed that plasma biomarkers have the potential to be used as surrogate biomarkers in Alzheimer's disease (AD) clinical trials. More specifically, this study demonstrated that plasma p-tau181 could potentially be used to monitor large-scale population interventions targeting preclinical AD individuals.

== Criticism ==
There have been a number of instances when studies using surrogate markers have been used to show benefit from a particular treatment, but later, a repeat study looking at endpoints has not shown a benefit, or has even shown a harm. In 2021, the FDA came under heavy criticism for the approval of an alzheimer's drug called Aduhelm based on a surrogate endpoint that was later shown to be based on fraudulent data.

== Reporting Guidelines ==
Reporting surrogate endpoints in randomized controlled trials is an emerging source of concern for clinicians and epidemiologists. This issue has been addressed in two reporting guidelines called CONSORT and SPIRIT, which will help researchers report surrogate endpoints in randomized controlled trials.

== See also ==
- FDA Accelerated Approval Program based on surrogate endpoints
